= Seneca Glass Company =

Defunct popular glassware company

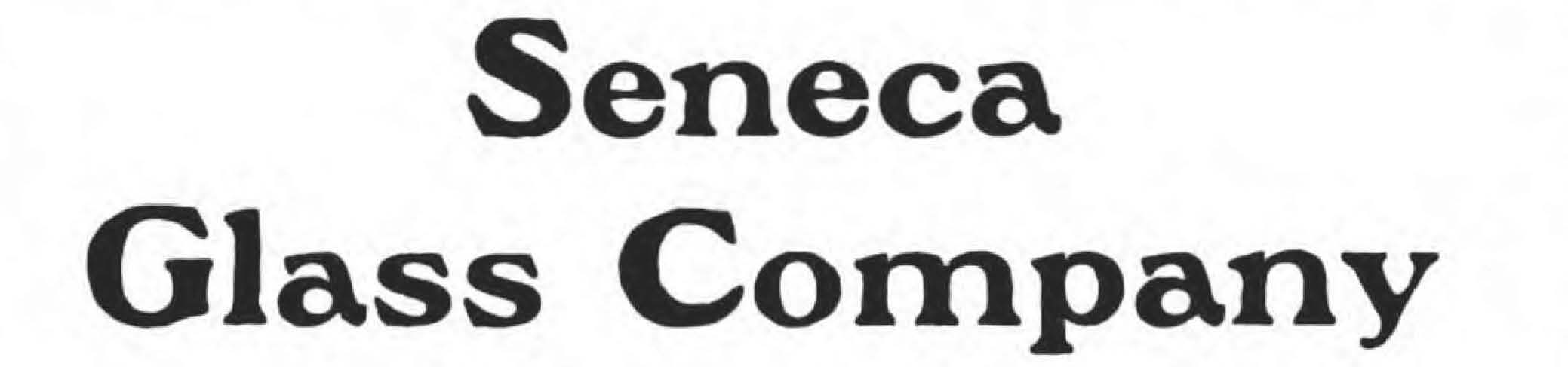
- Company type: Corporation
- Industry: Glass manufacturing
- Predecessor: Fostoria Glass Company
- Founded: 1891
- Founder: Otto Jaeger, Michael Dinger, George Truog, August Boehler, and Leopold Sigwart
- Defunct: 1982
- Fate: Sold
- Successor: Seneca Crystal Inc. (bankrupt in 1983)
- Headquarters: Fostoria, Ohio and Morgantown, West Virginia
- Key people: Leopold Sigwart, August Boehler, Joseph A. Kammerer
- Products: lead-blown tumblers, stemware, and tableware
- Revenue: ~$2 million (1969)
- Number of employees: 250 (1898)

Seneca Glass Company was a glass manufacturer that began in Fostoria, Ohio, in 1891. At one time it was the largest manufacturer of blown tumblers (drinking glasses) in the United States. The company was also known for its high-quality lead (crystal) stemware, which was hand-made for nearly a century. Customers included Eleanor Roosevelt and Lyndon B. Johnson, and retailers such as Marshall Field and Company, Neiman Marcus, and Tiffany's.

The company took possession of its Fostoria plant on January 1, 1892, after it was vacated by the Fostoria Glass Company. Otto Jaeger was the first president of Seneca Glass Company, and he had been part of the Fostoria Glass Company management team. Like Jaeger, many of the new company's original leaders were German craftsmen experienced in glassmaking. In addition to being investors in the company, these craftsmen worked in the plant. In 1896, the firm moved to Morgantown, West Virginia, and continued to produce high-quality decorated glassware. A second plant was built close to Morgantown in 1911 to produce less-elaborate ware.

During the 1950s, Seneca introduced its Driftwood Casual table setting pattern in an attempt to capture a less formal segment of the glassware market. This pattern was produced for nearly 30 years, and became especially important to the company as formal glassware became less popular. In 1982, the company was sold to a group of investors that renamed the firm Seneca Crystal Incorporated. The firm filed for bankruptcy in 1983. Today, the Seneca Glass Company building in Morgantown is listed in the National Register of Historic Places and contains small retail shops and offices.

== Background ==
=== Glassmaking ===
Glass is made by starting with a batch of ingredients (mostly sand), melting it, forming the glass product, and gradually cooling it. (Note: The batch of ingredients is dominated by sand, which contains silica. Other ingredients such as soda ash, potash, and either red lead or lime are added.) The batch is placed inside a pot or tank that is heated by a furnace to roughly 3090 °F (1700 °C). The melted batch is typically shaped into the glass product (other than window or plate glass) by either a glassblower or by pressing it into a mold (also spelled "mould"). Most glass factories had a summer stop where the production was shut down for about six weeks. This was done because the summer heat combined with the heat of the furnace to make the work environment almost unbearable for workers in the hot end (near molten glass). The summer stop also allowed time to perform maintenance on the facility without disrupting the production process.

The Seneca Glass Company used European glass production methods learned by their founders in Germany. The glass that was made was lead flint glass, which is made mostly from silica, potash, and oxide of lead. This type of glass has more sparkle and shine than flint glass made from lime. Technology from the 1890s and earlier was used throughout the company's existence. A glassblower's assistant (the gatherer) used a hollow pipe to extract molten glass from a pot. The glassblower and his crew used air, hand tools, and molds to shape the glass into the desired form. In some cases, a rim glazer was used to polish edges of the glass using small jets of flame.

The glass product had to be cooled gradually (annealed), or else it would become brittle and possibly break. A long conveyer oven used for annealing is called a lehr. In the case of the glassware made at Seneca's Morgantown plant, it took almost two hours for the glass to move from the hot end of the lehr to the cool end. Packers, generally girls and women, removed the cooled glass from the lehr and packed the product for shipping. Some of the finished glass would be cut, etched, or engraved before it was packed. Glass with gold or silver trim added would be reheated to fuse the trim to the glass.

Making glassware at Seneca Glass Company's Morgantown plant
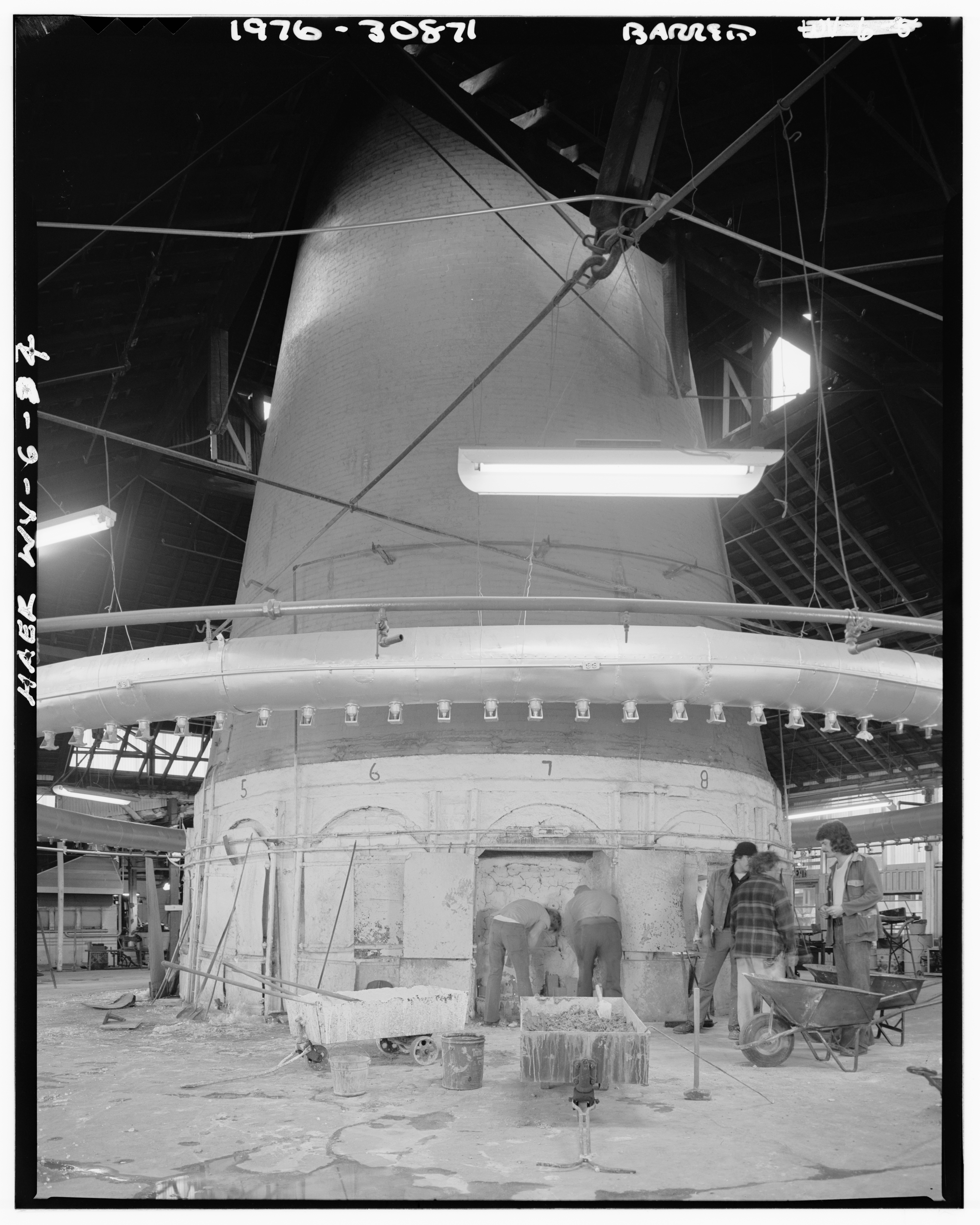
Furnace for melting batch

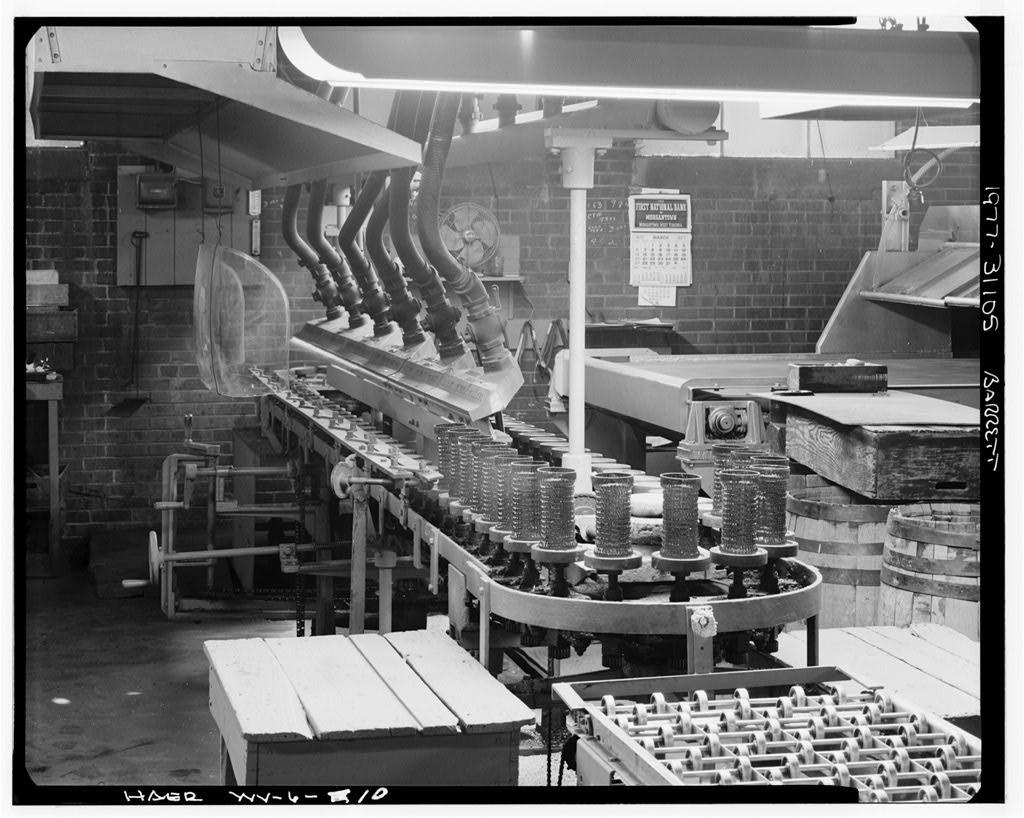
Rim glazer in foreground and hot end of lehr in back on right

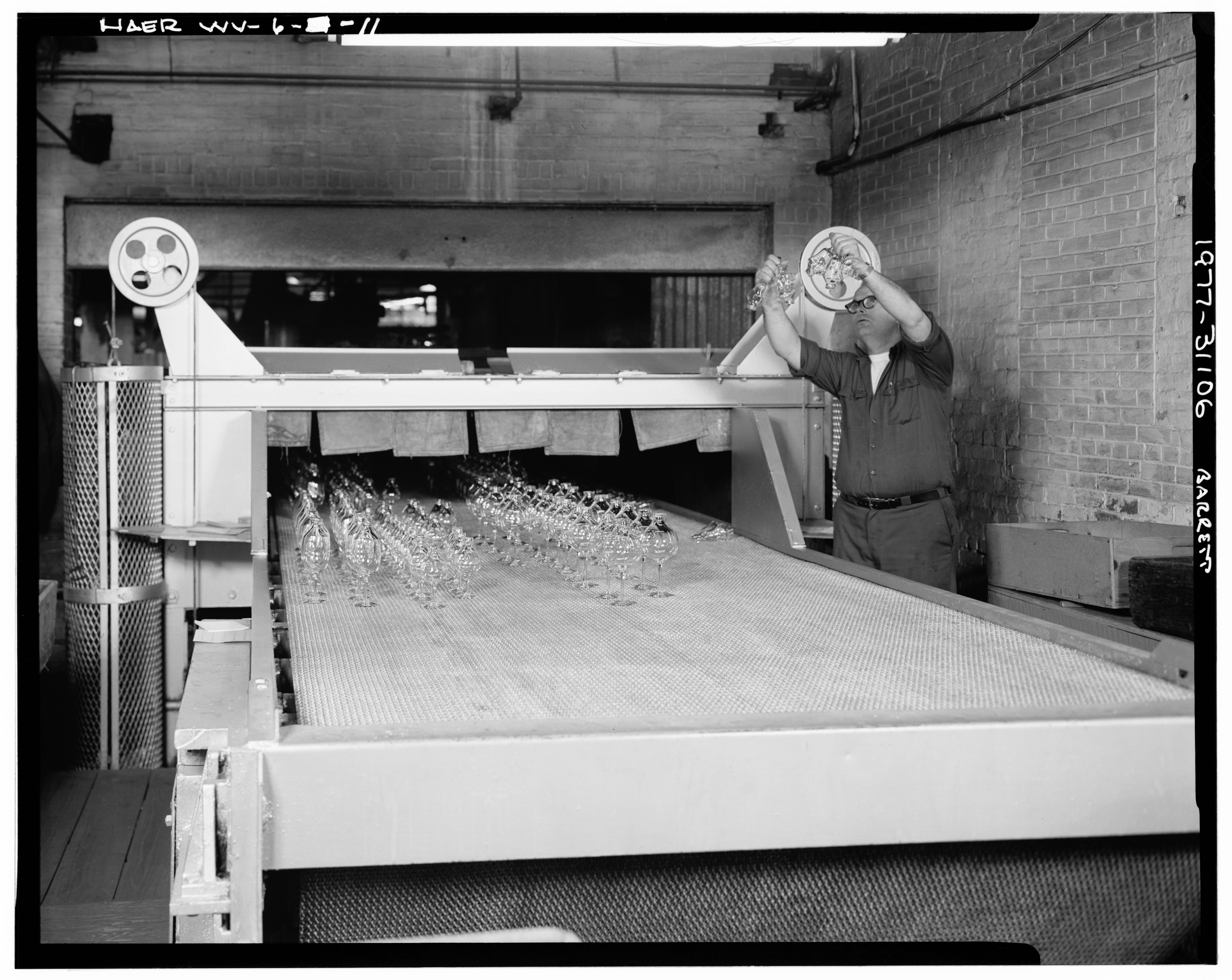
Inspector at cool end of lehr

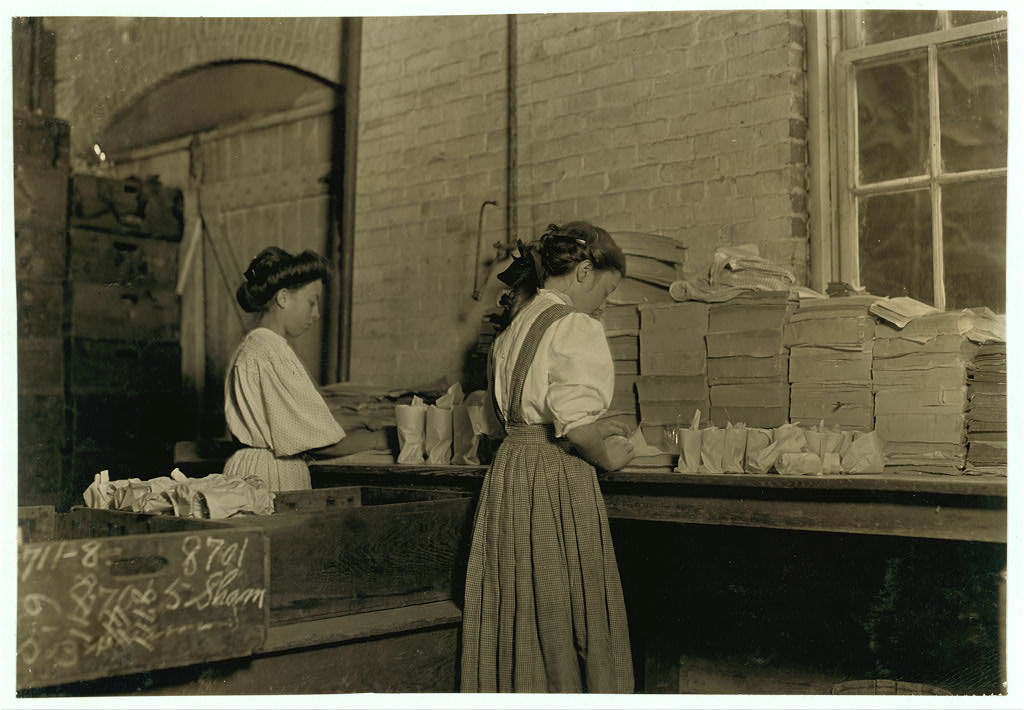
Packing finished glassware

Because most glass plants melted their ingredients in a pot during the 1880s, the plant's number of pots was often used to describe a plant's capacity. The ceramic pots were located inside the furnace, and contained molten glass created by melting the batch of ingredients. One of the major expenses for the glass factories is fuel for the furnace. Wood and coal had long been used as fuel for glassmaking. An alternative fuel, natural gas, became a desirable fuel for making glass in the late 19th century because it is clean, gives a uniform heat, is easier to control, and melts the batch of ingredients faster.

=== Ohio glass industry ===
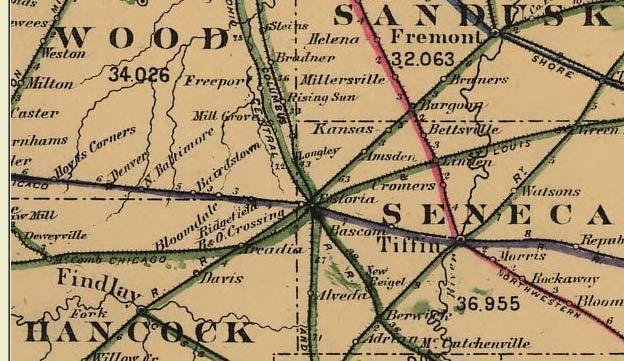
1882 Ohio Railroad Map for area around Findlay, Fostoria (center), and Tiffin

In the 1870s Ohio had a glass industry located principally in the eastern portion of the state, especially in coal-rich Belmont County. The Belmont County community of Bellaire, located on the Ohio side of the Ohio River across from Wheeling, West Virginia, was known as "Glass City" from 1870 to 1885. In early 1886, a major discovery of natural gas (the Karg Well) occurred in northwest Ohio near the small village of Findlay. Communities in northwestern Ohio began using low-cost natural gas along with free land and cash to entice manufacturing companies (especially glass makers) to start operations in their towns. The enticement efforts were successful, and at least 70 glass factories existed in northwest Ohio between 1886 and the early 20th century.

The city of Fostoria, already blessed with multiple railroad lines, was close enough to the natural gas that it was able to use a pipeline to make natural gas available to businesses. Eventually, Fostoria had 13 different glass companies at various times between 1887 and 1920. (Note: The count of Fostoria glass companies varies depending on how restarts and reorganizations are counted. The Fostoria Ohio Glass Association lists 13 companies for 1887-1920. Jack K. Paquette discusses 15 companies plus four post-boom companies in Chapter V of his Blowpipes book.) The gas boom in northwestern Ohio enabled the state to improve its national ranking as a manufacturer of glass (based on value of product) from 4th in 1880 to 2nd in 1890. By 1891, northwestern Ohio had problems with its gas supply, and the glass industry had over–expanded. (Note: Paquette notes that the pressure in gas wells was trending lower by late 1888, especially during the cold winters of 1888 and 1889. By early 1890, gas flow to factories was occasionally restricted and sometimes shut off completely.) The Fostoria Glass Company, which had been founded at the beginning of the Northwest Ohio gas boom, decided to move to West Virginia near coal supplies. It vacated its South Vine Street plant in Fostoria in late December 1891. About 60 workers made the move to West Virginia, leaving the plant's remaining glassworkers unemployed.

=== German craftsmen ===
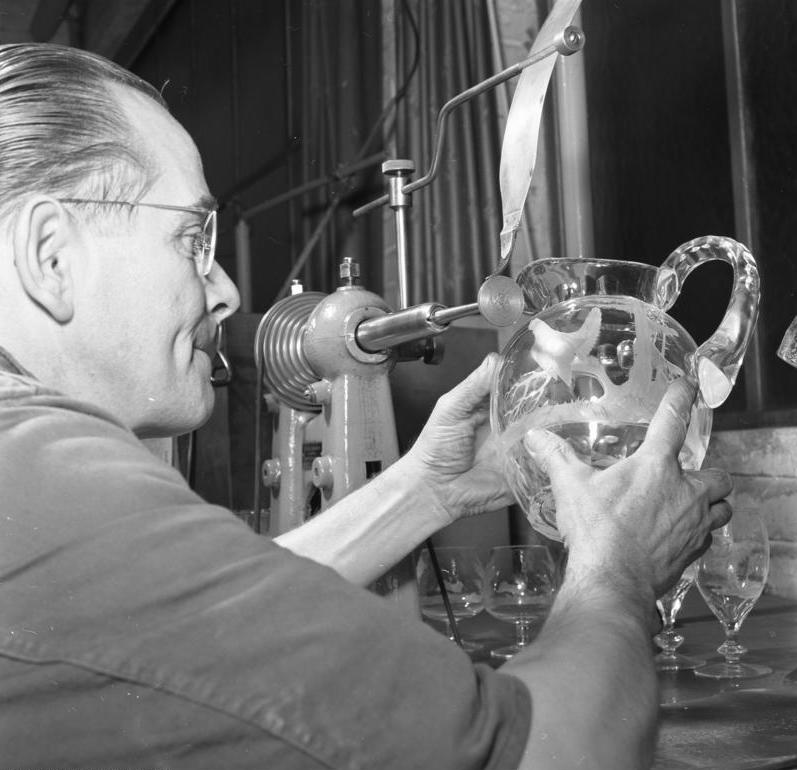
German glass engraver, circa 1912

During the 1880s, a group of glassmakers from the Black Forest region of Germany (and Switzerland) moved to Cumberland, Maryland, to work in the city's glass factories. These men were skilled in art glassmaking, and hoped to someday start their own business where they could fully utilize their talents. During 1891, it became known that the Fostoria Glass Company planned to move away from Fostoria. The Black Forest glassmakers held a meeting on August 10, and formed a company to buy the soon-to-be vacated Fostoria glass works. The German investor group selected another German, Otto Jaeger, to be their leader. Jaeger had been part of the Fostoria Glass Company management team, and was experienced in glass etching and engraving. The Fostoria plant and its permanent equipment were sold for $20,000 (equivalent to $716,667 in 2025) to the German investors during the Fall of 1891. (Note: The sale price for the Fostoria factory and equipment is either $20,000 or $10,000—depending on the source. Paquette's book, using a Fostoria newspaper as its source, states that Otto Jaeger made the purchase for $20,000. A Maryland newspaper says the Cumberland investment group spent $10,000—although Jaeger and a Wheeling investor are not mentioned as part of the group.)

Although the company's plant was in Fostoria, Ohio, it was granted its charter in West Virginia on December 4, 1891. The incorporators were Otto Jaeger of Fostoria, Michael Dinger of Wheeling, George Truog of Cumberland, August Boehler of Cumberland, and Leopold Sigwart of Cumberland. (Note: Paquette's book notes that Leopold Sigwart had several ways to spell his surname, and uses "Seigwart". A March 1896 advertisement for Seneca Glass uses "Sigwart" as the spelling. Later in the year another Seneca Glass Company ad used the "Seigwart" spelling. A 1959 Cumberland newspaper (Sigwart's original American hometown) uses the "Sigwart" spelling.) Jaeger had also worked at Wheeling's Hobbs, Brockunier and Company, and Dinger was his brother-in-law. One commonly made mistake is the assumption that Seneca Glass Company was located in Ohio's Seneca County. While most of Fostoria is in Seneca County, the Seneca Glass South Vine Street plant was located in Hancock County, a few blocks west of the Seneca County border. The shareholders of the new glass company named their firm after the Seneca Indians.

== Fostoria ==
=== Beginning ===
Otto Jaeger assembled an experienced and highly skilled workforce for the Seneca Glass Company. Fostoria Glass Company left over half of its workforce in Fostoria. Many of these workers sought employment with the Seneca Glass Company—where they could continue to work in the same (South Vine Street) factory. Jaeger also had the expert investor/glass men from Cumberland, Maryland. Among these men were Truog, Boehler, Sigwart, and Edward and Joseph A. Kammerer. Jaeger became president, while Edward Kammerer was vice president and general manager. Truog was secretary. Thus, the company's leaders and shareholders consisted of mostly glassworkers instead of bankers or wealthy businessmen. Jaeger, Edward Kammerer, and Truog were also elected to the board of directors, as were Boehler and Sigwart. After only a few months, Truog returned to Cumberland to start the Maryland Glass Etching Works. He was replaced as secretary by Frank B. Bannister in March 1892, and W. H. Bannister became treasurer.

=== Fostoria operations ===
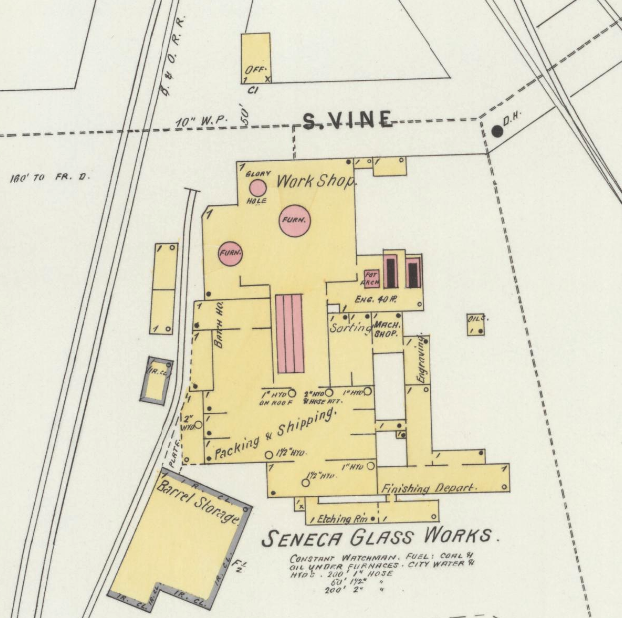
Seneca Glass works in Fostoria

The new company began blowing lead glassware on December 29, 1891—before Fostoria Glass had officially moved out of the factory. With its experienced workforce, production proceeded at the Seneca Glass works with no problems. The company advertised itself in 1892 as a "manufacturer of fine lead blown table and bar goods", and noted "All our goods have fire finished edges". Another advertisement mentioned "Fine Lead Stemware". (Note: Murray shows a full–page advertisement for Seneca Glass Company from an 1892 issue of the Fostoria Tatler, and he also shows a small advertisement from another Fostoria Tatler issue that mentions stemware.) The original 1887 Fostoria Glass Company plant was considered large for the time, as it had a furnace with a capacity of 12 pots. The Seneca Glass version of the plant occupied 2.5 acres (1.0 ha), was close to two railroads, and had a rail siding that connected with a third one—the Baltimore and Ohio Railroad (a.k.a. B&O). (Note: Murray's source for the description of the Seneca Glass Company plant, including its acreage, is the October 22, 1892, edition of the Fostoria Tatler.)

Despite occasional shutdowns caused by low gas pressure (gas was the fuel used by the furnace), production and sales were strong enough to justify an increase in capacity. A May 1892 trade journal said that Seneca Glass Company planned to add another furnace that would increase their capacity to 38 pots—making it the "largest factory in the United States manufacturing tumblers alone". (Note: Both sources cite the May 12, 1892 edition of Crockery & Glass Journal for the discussion of the increase in capacity to 38 pots and the company being the largest.) About 200 people were employed by the company. Because the production method used by the company emphasized handmade products, the workforce was, by necessity, highly skilled and well paid. (Note: Murray cites the October 22, 1892, edition of the Fostoria Tatler for the discussion of the glass works and employees.)

Seneca Glass resumed operations in September 1893 after a summer break

The company continued to be successful and survived the economic disruption of the Panic of 1893. An example of Fostoria's gas problem occurred in October 1894, when lack of gas pressure forced Seneca Glass and Fostoria Shade and Lamp to temporarily shut down. Despite the gas problem, the Seneca Glass works employed over 230 people in 1895. Although there had been talk of expansion, the company was considering moving. The plant switched its fuel source from natural gas to coal (coal gas), but management was unhappy with the high cost of coal in Fostoria.

=== Management change ===
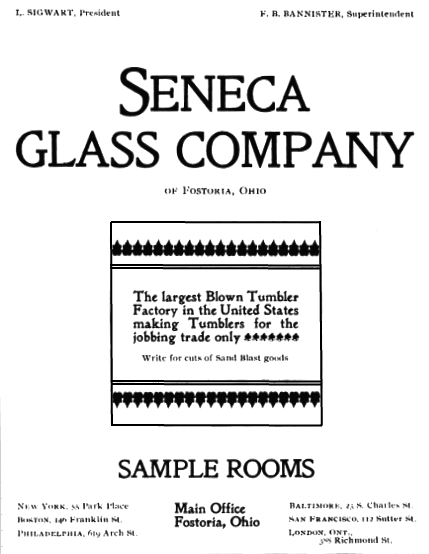
March 1896 advertisement

Late in 1895, production stopped as the workforce (which was non-union) went on strike because of unsatisfactory working conditions. The strike lasted from December 13 until January 17, 1896. During the work stoppage, a group of investors led by Leopold Sigwart removed Otto Jaeger as president. Jaeger resisted the change, causing the Sigwart group to install a new lock on the president's office. In protest, Edward Kammerer resigned as plant manager. Sigwart was elected president, and Kammerer was replaced as plant manager by his brother, Joseph. (Note: Paquette cites the January 20, 1896 edition of the Fostoria Review as his source for the Jaeger–Sigwart turmoil.) By March 1896, the ousted Jaeger was trying to form another company in Fostoria.

The March edition of a trade magazine contained an advertisement for the company that listed "L. Sigwart" as president and "F.B. Bannister" as superintendent. Another page in the same magazine mentioned that the "Seneca Glass Company under its new management is vigorously pushing its business this year..." and that "this factory ranks first in production of blown tumblers in this country...." By summertime, the plant was working at full force to keep up with orders, and a tumbler with an etched image of former Ohio governor and current (1896) presidential candidate William McKinley was expected to be popular.

=== Factory change ===
In the summer of 1896, it was announced that the company would move to Morgantown, West Virginia. The reason for the move was the fuel problem: absence of natural gas (at times) and the cost of coal. Morgantown was a desirable location because of transportation, fuel, and raw materials—and a cash subsidy. Oil and gas had recently been discovered in the Morgantown area, providing excellent options for fuel in addition to the coal that was abundant in the Monongalia County, West Virginia, area. River transportation between Pittsburgh and Morgantown improved during the 1890s because of a new river lock on the Monongahela River. Railroad transportation became available after the B&O Railroad connected Morgantown to the nation's railroad network. Good quality sand, a major raw material for glassmaking, was available from Berkeley Springs, West Virginia, and Hancock, Maryland. The Seneca Glass Company's incentives to move to Morgantown were free property, low-priced gas, and $20,000 (equivalent to $774,000 in 2025). The move was temporarily delayed after a legal complaint by Otto Jaeger filed in Hancock County Court. However, a November settlement allowed the company to move. The Fostoria glass works building remained vacant until 1905, when it became the site for the Seneca Wire and Manufacturing Company.

== Morgantown ==
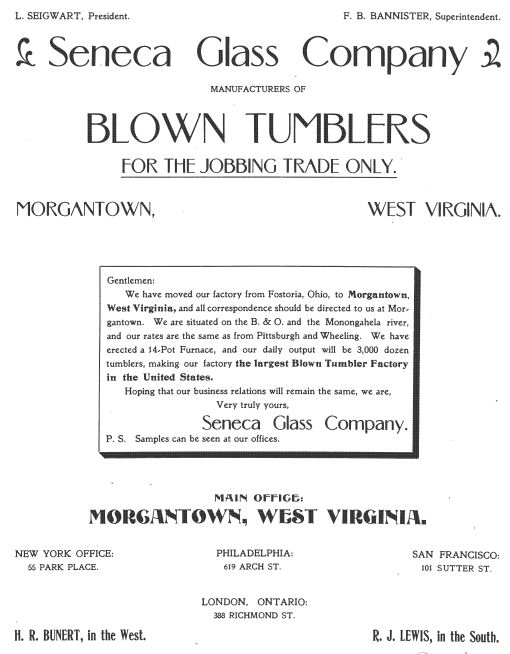
December 1896 advertisement for Seneca Glass Company

=== Startup ===
The company's Morgantown glass works was constructed in 1896 and 1897. An advertisement in the December 1896 edition of a glass trade magazine announced the move. The plant was (and still is) located on Beechhurst Avenue, with access to the Monongahela River and Baltimore & Ohio Railroad. The furnace had 14 pots. The original facility included a furnace/blowing room, a lehr room, packing area, and warehouse. It also had smaller rooms where the glass was decorated. The furnace/blowing room is mostly brick, and contained a huge smokestack. The room is one story plus a basement. The lehr room is one-story, and measures about 60 feet (18.3 m) long by 60 feet (18.3 m) wide. As the company grew, expansions to the Morgantown plant were made during the 1920s and in 1947.

Production began in January 1897. The company typically employed 150 men, 50 boys, and 50 girls. About 100 of those 250 workers were highly-skilled. Products were mostly lead (crystal) table ware, and it was all hand blown. Typical production was about three carloads of glassware per week—a company advertisement said 3,000 dozen tumblers per day. December 1896 advertising continued the company's "largest blown tumbler" theme. The company was described as having 250 employees in 1898.

=== More changes ===
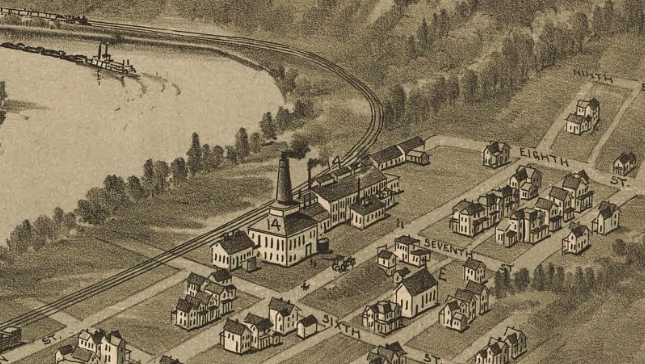
1897 drawing of Seneca Glass plant in Morgantown

A stockholders' meeting was held in January 1899, and management changed. Leopold Sigwart resigned as company president, and Frank W. Bannister resigned as manager. New officers were August Boehler as president, "Andrew" Kammerer as vice president, F. B. Bannister as secretary, and W. H. Bannister as treasurer. (Note: Andrew Kammerer was Joseph Anthony Kammerer, one of the organizers of Seneca Glass Company in Fostoria.) The Bannisters, W. H. and his son Frank B., soon left Seneca Glass to organize the Morgantown Glass Works. In the January 1900 stockholder's meeting, Leopold Sigwart took W.H. Bannister's place as a company director. Officers remained the same except Charles F. Boehler became secretary and Frank Caples became treasurer. At the time of the elder Bannister's death in 1901, he was president of Morgantown Glass Works, and his son was the new company's manager. (Note: W.H. Bannister and F.B. Bannister organized the Morgantown Glass Works in 1899. Other incorporators were W.H. Bush, Leopold Sigwart, and Frank Caples.)

A newspaper described Seneca Glass Company in 1901 as flourishing with a "cheap fuel supply and natural shipping advantages" while competing with a tumbler trust that it refused to join. In 1902, a fire damaged portions of the interior of the facility. Losses from the fire were estimated to be $50,000 (equivalent to $1,860,577 in 2025), and 350 people temporarily had no place to work. The plant was repaired and additions were made to the original structure, including a two-story replacement for a room damaged by the fire. This repair/addition was designed by prominent local architect Elmer F. Jacobs.

June 1904 was a record month for the company, and every month through September 1904 broke the record from 1903. During September, Charles Boehler was listed as secretary and manager. Advertising emphasized find lead blown bar and table glassware, tumblers, stemware, and etching—and no longer included the "largest blown tumbler" theme. The company was granted a new West Virginia charter in 1905. Major shareholders were Leopold Sigwart, Otto Sigwart, August Boehler, and J. A. Kammerer. Each held 120 shares of stock—totaling to 480 of the 873 total shares outstanding. Among the 16 remaining shareholders were Joseph Stenger (75 shares), George Truog (30 shares), and Frances Bannister (8 shares). The company made a change in its fuel source in late 1910, replacing natural gas with coal.

=== Plant B ===
Seneca Glass Company opened a second plant, known as "Plant B", that was formerly the plant of the Romana Glass Company. It was located in Star City, West Virginia, about two miles (3.2 km) from the Morgantown works. Production began in the second half of 1911 or early 1912, and Plant B employed 80 to 150 people. (Note: Sources differ on production start dates and the number of employees. The Clarksburg Daily Telegram has a January 1912 start date for 150 employees. A county geological and economic survey says the plant began production in August 1911 with 80 employees.) Products were mostly undecorated tumblers, and the glassware was hand blown. Lime, instead of lead, was used to make the glass from two small tanks instead of pots. Lime glass, also called soda–lime glass, costs much less than the lead glass used at the Morgantown plant, and the glass quality is almost as good. Tank furnaces are more efficient than pots, but they are more costly to build. The plant was originally managed by Otto Sigwart. In 1914, Otto's son Charles became manager. Factory B closed in September 1918 when demand subsided after World War I. Negotiations to sell the plant were discussed in February 1920, but no sale was accomplished. Factory B reopened in July 1920 with 75 workers. In 1929, secretary–treasurer Charles F. Boehler announced that Plant B would reopen after a year of "idleness", giving employment to between 75 and 100 men. The plant operated until 1931.

=== Family business ===
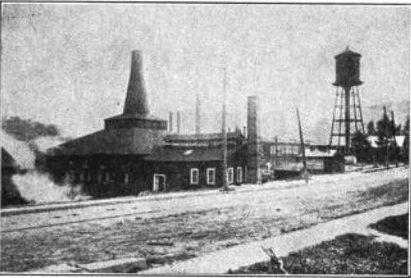
Morgantown glass works in 1920s

The company was always owned by a small group of stockholders, and the founders and their families managed the company throughout its existence. Another original investor, Joseph Anthony "Andy" Kammerer, became president in 1917. (Note: Another source says that Joseph A. "Andy" Kammerer served as president beginning 1920. An advertisement in 1927 listed "A. Kammerer" as president, and an article on the same page called him "Andrew Kammerer".) In 1927, management was listed as J.A. Kammerer president and general manager; Leopold Sigwart VP and factory manager; and Charles F. Boehler, secretary, treasurer, sales manager, and purchasing agent. Leopold Sigwart died in 1937. Kammerer served as president until his death in 1941. At that time, Charles F. Boehler was elected president and treasurer. Boehler died in 1945. Harry G. Kammerer (son of J.A. Kammerer), became company president, and Harry's stepson John W. Weimer, succeeded him.

Another family member in the glass business was James Sigwart, who was vice president of Seneca Glass Company when he died in 1950. In 1959, a newspaper noted that the Seneca Glass Company "president, vice president, and secretary–treasurer are descendants of the men who organized the company...a Kammerer is president, a Sigwart vice president, and a Stenger secretary–treasurer". Louis W. Stenger died later in 1959, and he had served as "an official with the Seneca Glass Co. for more than 40 years". Harry G. Kammerer was still the company's president and treasurer in 1972. John Weimer was described as general manager in a February 1974 newspaper article, while the same newspaper called him president in October of the same year.

== Products ==
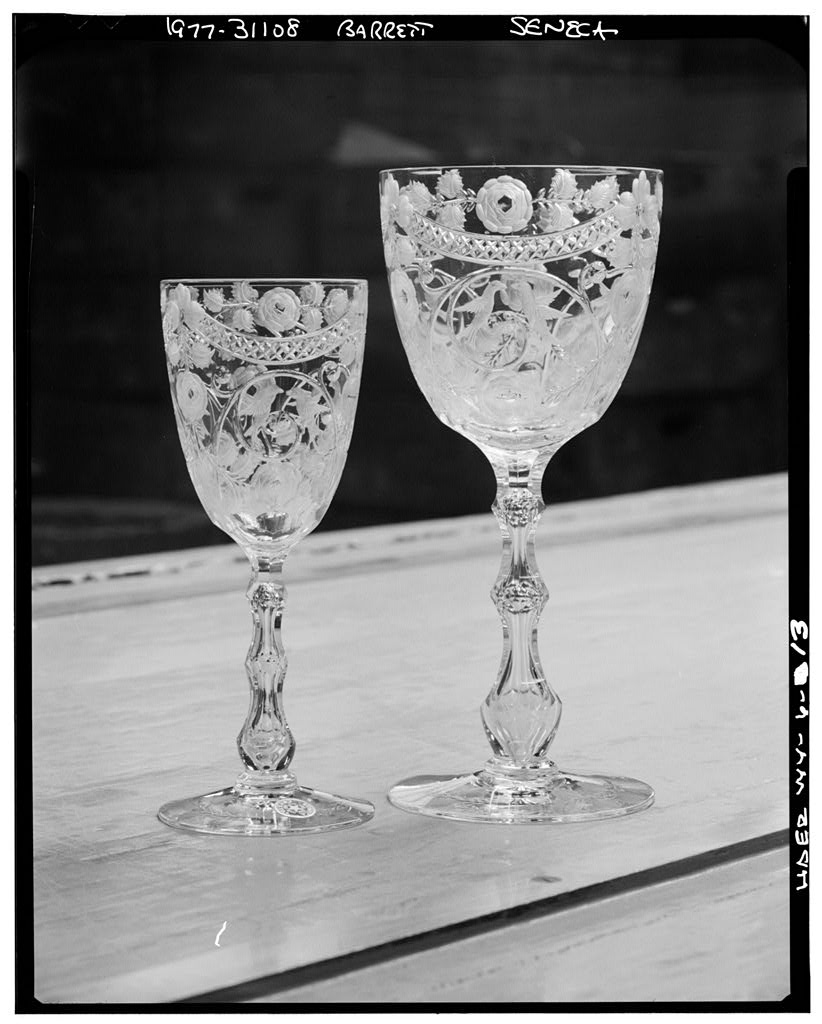
Seneca Glass Company glassware

During its early years, Seneca Glass Company was the largest producer of blown tumblers in the United States, and it specialized in etched designs on its glassware, such as an advertisement for a hotel or bar. In 1914 World War I caused the company to temporarily make watch crystals for American wristwatches because imported crystals were not available. The company gradually became known for its high quality table ware. An example of the type of retailer that sold Seneca Glass products is a 1932 advertisement by Bloomingdale's that mentions a sale on "Hand–Blown Crystal Glass" made by Seneca Glass Company—"famous for quality glass". In 1961 the state of West Virginia listed some of Seneca Glass Company's well–known customers. That list included Marshall Field and Company, Neiman Marcus, the Pinnacle Club in New York, the Tudor Room of the Sheraton Palace Hotel in San Francisco, the Ritz Carlton Hotel of Boston, and Tiffany's of New York. Eleanor Roosevelt and one of Liberia's presidents were also purchasers of glassware made by Seneca Glass Company. In 1962 the wife of Vice President Lyndon B. Johnson chose Seneca's Epicure pattern for the family's personal table ware—bringing attention to the company and that pattern. By 1969, total company sales were said to "range in the neighborhood of $2 million" (equivalent to $17,558,984 in 2025).

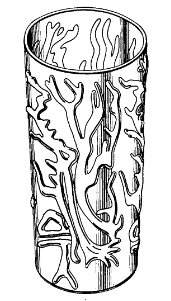
Stenger's design

Informal dining ware also became important for the company. In 1953 the company's Louis W. Stenger received a patent for an ornamental design on a drinking glass. That year, Seneca Glass Company began producing its Driftwood Casual dinnerware pattern, which targeted the informal dining market. The decision to produce a less-formal product proved wise, as formal dinnerware became less popular during the next decade. The Driftwood Casual" pattern was popular, and it was produced for 30 years. (Note: Examples of advertisements that included Driftwood Casual can be found newspapers such as the Washington Evening Star, Rochester's Democrat and Chronicle, Ohio's Delaware Gazette, and the Cincinnati Enquirer.) One of the company's own showroom advertisements in 1969 mentioned colors available for Driftwood Casual: amber, crystal, peacock blue, accent red, moss green, delphine blue, heather, and brown. A showroom advertisement from 1970 says that Driftwood Casual was hand blown, hand finished, "casual lead glassware...available in sixteen distinctive items, and in eight sophisticated colors."

Seneca Glass introduced additional informal dining patterns during the 1970s, although these were not as successful as Driftwood. In 1971 a company spokesman noted that the trend at that time was toward "casual–looking glassware" and "colored stemware". Among Seneca patterns were Fashionable and Cascade, which was similar to Driftwood Casual. A January 23, 1972, newspaper article said last part of 1971 was good for Seneca Glass Company, and the outlook for the year was encouraging.

== Demise ==
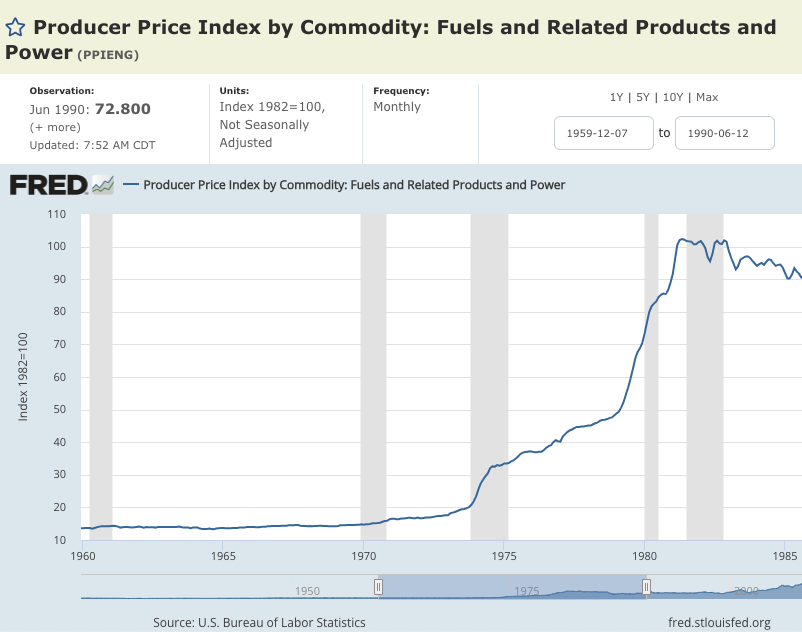
Increasing energy costs and recessions of the 1970s

In 1968, Mr. J. Raymond Price made a presentation on behalf of the American Hand–Made Glassware Industry before the Committee on Ways and Means of the U.S. House of Representatives. Price noted that he represented 14 companies that produced hand-made glassware, but the group numbered 39 companies in 1950. He stated that the primary reason for the loss of those companies was the inability to compete with non-domestic companies that had an advantage of low wages.

During portions of the 1970s labor and fuel costs increased significantly. The United States experienced recessions from December 1969 until November 1970, November 1973 to March 1975, January 1980 to July 1980, and July 1981 to November 1982.

In the early 1980s leaders of the glass industry again complained about overseas competition and high fuel costs. However, the main reason for the demise of the Seneca Glass Company and makers of similar products was a decline of interest in fine glassware. The Seneca plant was sold in 1982 to investors that named their new company Seneca Crystal Incorporated. By August 1983 the purchasers closed the factory and filed for bankruptcy.

== Legacy ==
Seneca Glass Company's glassware enabled its products to be sold abroad and in American's outlets. The company continued using manufacturing methods developed in the 1890s into the 1980s. The former Seneca Glass Company plant in Morgantown remained standing as of 2023. It is known as Seneca Center, the building houses offices, restaurants, and specialty shops, and was added to the National Register of Historic Places in 1985.

Otto Jaeger, the ousted first president of Seneca Glass Company, founded the Bonita Art Glass Company in 1901. The Wheeling company employed 100 people, and specialized in decorating china and glass. W.H. Bannister, F. B. Bannister, Leopold Sigwart, and Frank Caples were among the incorporators of the Morgantown Glass Works in 1899. Economy Tumbler Company purchased that company during 1903. George Truog left the Seneca Glass Company shortly after it was formed, but remained a stockholder. He returned to Cumberland and founded the Maryland Glass Etching Works. Truog's Cumberland home (George Truog House) was listed in the National Register of Historic Places in 1986.

== Notes ==
=== References ===
- Bredehoft, Neila M.; Bredehoft, Thomas H. (1997). Hobbs, Brockunier and Co., Glass: Identification and Value Guide. Paducah, KY: Collector Books. ISBN 978-0-89145-780-0. OCLC 37340501.
- Callahan, James Morton (1926). History of the Making of Morgantown, West Virginia: a Type Study in Trans-Appalachian Local History. Morgantown, West Virginia: West Virginia University Studies in History. OCLC 210893412. Archived from the original on August 29, 2023.
- Geological Survey of Ohio (1890). Annual Report of the Geological Survey of Ohio. Columbus, Ohio: Westbote Co., State Printers. OCLC 13585464. Archived from the original on August 3, 2023.
- Hennen, Ray V.; Reger, David B.; White, I.C. (1913). Marion, Monongalia and Taylor counties – West Virginia Geological and Economic Survey. Wheeling, WV: Wheeling News Litho. Co. OCLC 15654857. Archived from the original on September 8, 2023.
- McKelvey, Alexander T. (1903). Centennial History of Belmont county, Ohio and Representative Citizens. Chicago: Biographical Publishing Company. OCLC 318390043. "Centennial history of belmont county."
- Murray, Melvin L. (1992). Fostoria, Ohio Glass II. Fostoria, OH: M. L. Murray. OCLC 27036061.
- Page, Bob; Frederiksen, Dale (1995). Seneca Glass Company, 1891-1983: A Stemware Identification Guide. Greensboro, NC: Page-Frederiksen Pub. Co.: Replacements [distributor]. ISBN 978-1-88997-702-7. OCLC 33078185.
- Paquette, Jack K. (2002). Blowpipes, Northwest Ohio Glassmaking in the Gas Boom of the 1880s. Xlibris Corp. ISBN 1-4010-4790-4. OCLC 50932436.
- Shotwell, David J. (2002). Glass A to Z. Iola, Wisconsin: Krause Publications. ISBN 978-0-87349-385-7. OCLC 440702171.
- Skrabec, Quentin R. (2007). Glass in Northwest Ohio. Charleston, South Carolina: Arcadia. ISBN 978-0-73855-111-1. OCLC 124093123.
- United States Census Office (1895). Report on manufacturing industries in the United States at the eleventh census: 1890. Washington: Government Printing Office. OCLC 10470409.
- United States; United States Congress (90th, 2nd session: 1968). House (1968). Foreign Trade and Tariff Proposals: Hearings before the Committee on Ways and Means, House of Representatives, Ninetieth Congress, Second Session on Tariff and Trade Proposals. Washington: United States Government Printing Office. OCLC 453392. Archived from the original on September 14, 2023.
- United States Department of Commerce, Bureau of Foreign and Domestic Commerce (1917). The Glass Industry. Report on the Cost of Production of Glass in the United States. Washington: Government Printing Office. OCLC 5705310.
- Venable, Wallace S.; Venable, Norma Jean (2007). Around Morgantown. Charleston, South Carolina: Arcadia Publishing. ISBN 978-0-73854-393-2. OCLC 128247476.
- Weeks, Joseph D.; United States Census Office (1884). Report on the Manufacture of Glass. Washington, District of Columbia: U.S. Government Printing Office. OCLC 2123984. Archived from the original on July 16, 2023.
- West Virginia (1893). Acts of the Legislature of West Virginia at its Twenty-First Regular and Extra Sessions, commencing January 11, and February 25, 1893. Charleston, West Virginia: Moses W. Donally, Public Printer. OCLC 24491764. Archived from the original on August 29, 2023.
- West Virginia (1899). Acts of the Legislature of West Virginia at its Twenty-Fourth Regular Session, commencing January 11, 1899. Charleston, West Virginia: Press Butler Printing Co. OCLC 7287536. Archived from the original on September 8, 2023.
- West Virginia; West Virginia Governor; West Virginia Legislature (1907). Public Documents (Corporation Report of Secretary of State - March 4, 1905 to March 1, 1907 - Charters Issued... Charleston, West Virginia: The Crossman Printing Company. OCLC 13484972. Archived from the original on September 2, 2023.
- West Virginia Department of Employment Security (1961). Employment Review, State of West Virginia. Charleston, West Virginia: West Virginia Department of Unemployment Compensation. OCLC 14040335.
- Zembala, Dennis (historian); Clement, Daniel (transcriber) (1973). "Seneca Glass Company" (PDF). Historic American Engineering Record (Library of Congress). HAER WV–6. Morgantown, West Virginia: National Park Service, U.S. Department of the Interior: – Written Historical and Descriptive Data. OCLC 20229044. Archived (PDF) from the original on September 2, 2023.
