= Fostoria Glass Company =

Defunct popular glassware company

- Type: Private company
- Industry: Glassware
- Founded: December 15, 1887 in Fostoria, Ohio
- Founder: Lucian B. Martin, William S. Brady
- Defunct: 1986
- Headquarters: Moundsville, West Virginia, U.S.
- Key people: Lucian B. Martin, William S. Brady, Charles Foster, William A. B. Dalzell
- Products: Glassware; tableware; candelabras
- Number of employees: 1000 (at peak in 1950)

The Fostoria Glass Company was a manufacturer of pressed, blown and hand-molded glassware and tableware. It began operations in Fostoria, Ohio, on December 15, 1887, on land donated by the townspeople. The new company was formed by men from West Virginia who were experienced in the glassmaking business. They started their company in northwest Ohio to take advantage of newly discovered natural gas that was an ideal fuel for glassmaking. Numerous other businesses were also started in the area, and collectively they depleted the natural gas supply. Fuel shortages caused the company to move to Moundsville, West Virginia, in 1891.

After the move to Moundsville, the company achieved a national reputation. Fostoria was considered one of the top producers of elegant glass. It had over 1,000 patterns, including one (American) that was produced for over 75 years. Showrooms were located in New York, Chicago, Dallas, San Francisco, and other large cities. The company advertised heavily, and one of its successes was sales through bridal registries. Fostoria products were made for several U.S. presidents. The company employed 1,000 people at its peak in 1950.

During the 1970s, foreign competition and changing preferences forced the company to make substantial investments in cost-saving automation technology. The changes were made too late, and the company's commercial division was losing money by 1980. The plant was closed permanently on February 28, 1986. Several companies continued making products using the Fostoria patterns, including the Dalzell-Viking Glass Company and Indiana Glass Company—both now closed.

== Background ==
In the last half of the 19th century, labor and fuel were the two largest expenses in U.S. glassmaking. People with the knowledge necessary to make glass were difficult to find. Management at Wheeling's J. H. Hobbs, Brockunier and Company had a policy of using skilled glassworkers from Europe, who would train the local employees—resulting in a superior workforce. In the 1860s, Wheeling, West Virginia, became a "hub for chemical and technological improvements to the composition of glass and the development of furnaces, molds, and presses" for making glass. By the end of the 1870s, the Hobbs glass works became the largest glass maker in the United States. (Note: The Hobbs glass works, located in South Wheeling in Ohio County, West Virginia, was renamed numerous times over a period of about 60 years. Some of the names were Barnes & Hobbs; Hobbs & Barnes; Hobbs, Brockunier & Company; and Hobbs Glass Company.) One of the earliest places to which the Hobbs glass making talent spread was Bellaire, Ohio, located in Belmont County, across the river from Wheeling and Ohio County. (Note: Bellaire is located in the Ohio coal belt, and therefore had a fuel source for local factories. By 1881, Bellaire had 15 glass factories, and was known as "Glass City".) Former employees of the Hobbs glass works became the talent that established many of the region's glass factories, and many became company presidents or plant managers.

Transportation resources were also important to the glass industry. Waterways provided an efficient and safe way to transport glass, especially before the construction of high-quality roads and the railroad system. (Note: An example of the importance of waterways can be observed in February 1912. It was reported that because of ice on the Ohio River, 600 barrels of glassware from the Fostoria Glass Company were waiting shipment at the Moundsville wharf.) As the railroad industry developed, it also became an important transportation resource. By 1880, almost all of the nation's top ten glass producing counties were located on a waterway. Allegheny County, Pennsylvania, (which includes Pittsburgh) was the nation's leading glass producer based on value of production. Ohio's Belmont County and West Virginia's Ohio County, separated by the Ohio River, ranked 6th and 7th.

Since fuel was one of the top two expenses in glassmaking, manufacturers needed to monitor its availability and cost. Wood and coal had long been used as fuel for glassmaking. An alternative fuel, gas, became a desirable fuel for making glass because it is clean, gives a uniform heat, is easier to control, and melts the batch of ingredients faster. Gas furnaces for making glass were first used in Europe in 1861. In early 1886, a major discovery of natural gas occurred near the small village of Findlay, Ohio. Communities in northwestern Ohio began using low-cost natural gas along with free land and cash to entice glass companies to start operations in their town. Their efforts were successful, and at least 70 glass factories existed in northwest Ohio between 1886 and 1900.

== Beginning ==
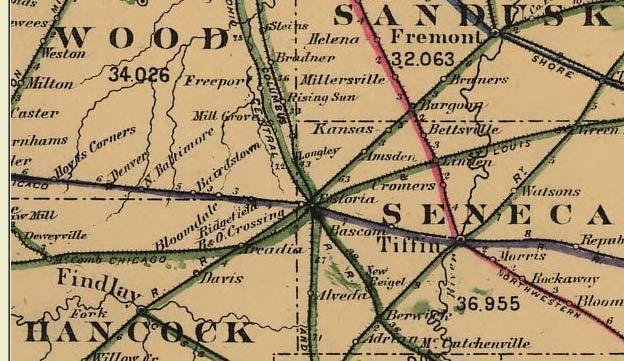
1882 Ohio railroad map for area around Fostoria

The Fostoria Glass Company was incorporated in West Virginia in July 1887. The founders of the Fostoria Glass Company were drawn to Fostoria, Ohio, to exploit the newly discovered natural gas. The new firm also received cash incentives of $5,000 (equivalent to $179,167 in 2025) to $6,000 (equivalent to $358,333 in 2025). The plant was located on Fostoria's South Vine Street and the town was served by multiple railroads. The factory's furnace had a capacity of 12 pots, and originally employed 125 workers. (Note: A pot was essentially a measure of a glass plant's capacity. Each ceramic pot was located inside the furnace. The pot contained molten glass created by melting a batch of ingredients that typically included sand, soda, and lime. Stationed around each pot was a team of laborers that extracted the molten glass and began the process of making the glass product.) Production of tableware, bar goods, and lamps began on December 15, 1887.

The glass men that formed the new company had gained their experience from working at the Hobbs, Brockunier and Company glass plant in Wheeling. Lucian B. Martin, the company's first president, had been a sales executive at the Hobbs works. William S. Brady, the company's secretary, had worked as a financial manager there and more recently managed a glass plant in Wellsburg, West Virginia. James B. Russell and Benjamin M. Hildreth had worked at the Hobbs plant, and Russell had also worked at a Pittsburgh glass works. German-born Otto Jaeger had been head of the engraving department at the Hobbs works. Former Ohio governor Charles Foster, son of the city of Fostoria's namesake, was added to this group of glass industry veterans to form the new company's board of directors.

Henry Humphreville, who had worked at Brady's Riverside Glass Company in Wellsburg, was hired as plant manager, and offered some diversity with his additional experience working in Pittsburgh—the nation's other center of glassmaking innovation. Many of the employees hired for the startup were from the Wheeling area. At least 20 "first class workmen" joined the company from Bellaire, Ohio, which is across the Ohio River from Wheeling. (Note: Deacon Scroggins, Jack Crimmel, and Hayes O'Neal were the first class workmen cited in a Bellaire newspaper article about the move. One author believes "Jack" Crimmel is probably Jacob Crimmel.) Henry and Jacob Crimmel were "key craftsmen in the early period of the company" and both had worked at Belmont Glass Company in Bellaire and the Hobbs plant in Wheeling. The Crimmel brothers had also been involved with the startup of the predecessor to the Belmont Glass Company. Crimmel family recipes for glass were used in the early days of the Fostoria Glass Company.

== Early products ==
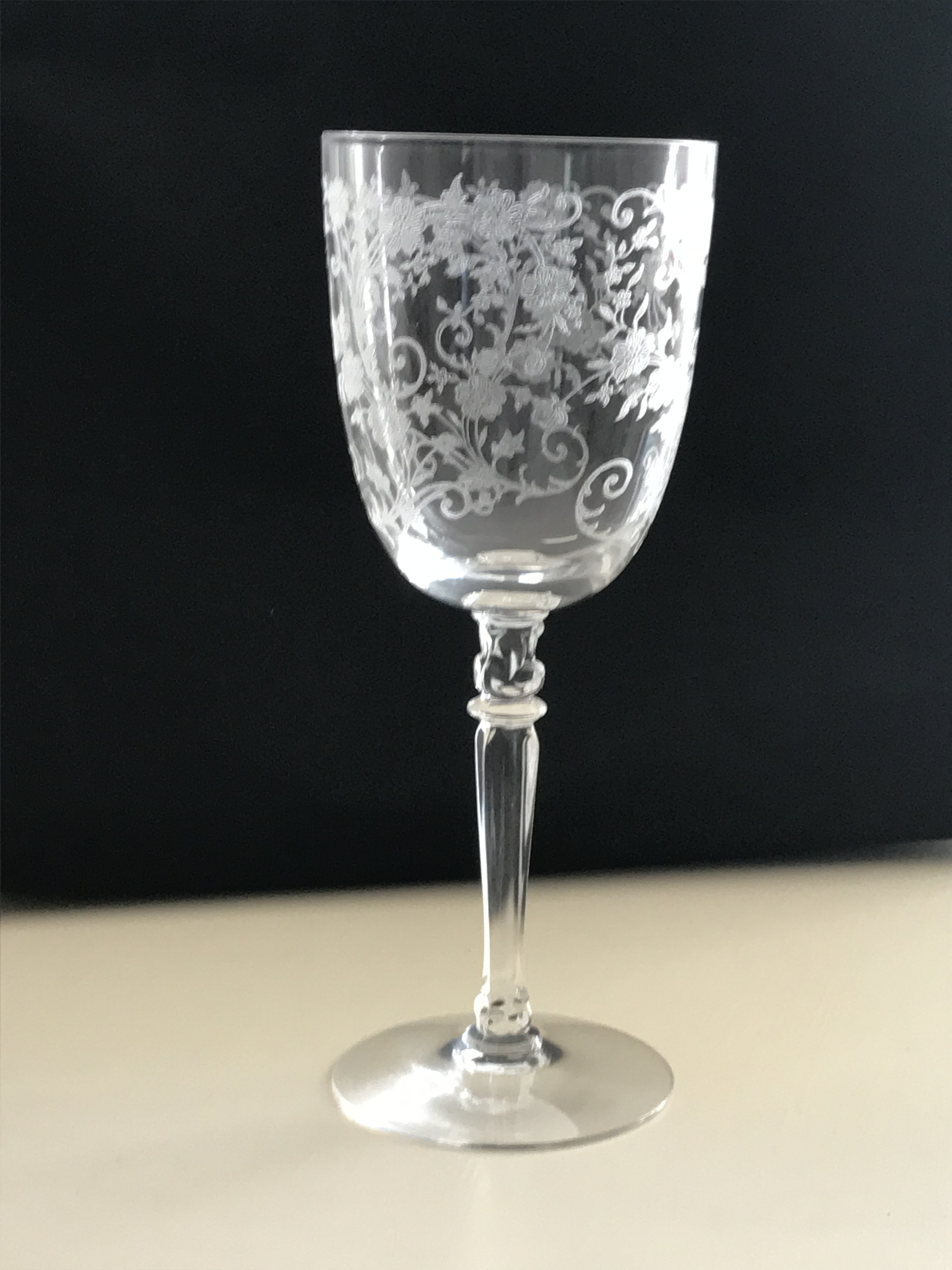
Etched stemware

The company advertised as a manufacturer of pressed glassware, and specialties were candle stands, candelabras, and banquet lamps. The first piece of glass pressed at the plant was a salt dip, pattern number 93. A popular early pattern called Cascade looked like a swirl and was used for candelabras and ink wells. It was also used for tableware such as containers for sugar, cream, and butter. Cascade was the first tableware pattern made, and it continued through the years under different names.

The company had many talented designers. Among them was Charles E. Beam, who was the head of the company's mold shop and eventually added to the board of directors. Beam's specialty was designing dishes with animals as the covers, and one of his creations that is "highly-prized" by today's collectors is a dish with a dolphin covering. Beam received a patent in 1890 for a glass mold that would enable pieces of chandeliers and candelabras to have small holes. Company president Martin was also a talented designer, and he patented the Cascade ink well (called an inkstand) in 1890 and a paper weight with swirl sides in 1891.

The company's first Virginia pattern was introduced around Christmas in 1888. (Note: Murray discusses the Virginia pattern, and identifies it as pattern number 140. He also shows an advertisement for the Virginia pattern in an 1889 edition of the Crockery and Glass Journal. Long and Seate do not identify this pattern, but list a Virginia plate etching as pattern 267 that was made from 1923 to 1929. They also list a Virginia glass pattern, number 2977, that was made from 1978 to 1986.) This pattern was quickly stolen (or "pirated") by a rival company. Fostoria Glass copied the copy, and named this purportedly new pattern Captain Kidd. Eventually this same Virginia/Captain Kidd pattern was also called Foster or Foster Block in honor of Charles Foster. An advertisement for the Captain Kidd pattern featured a butter dish, spoon dish, a sugar bowel, and a creamer.

Fostoria's Valencia pattern, number 205, is often called Artichoke because of the shape of the overlapping leaves on the bottom half of the glassware. This pattern was advertised in China, Glass and Lamps magazine in early 1891.

The Victoria pattern is popular with collectors, and a wide variety of products were made with this pattern. It is the only pattern that was patented by the company. Its appearance has a strong resemblance to a French company's pattern, and Fostoria Glass had some employees from France's glassmaking region. When the company moved to Moundsville, all of the molds for this pattern mysteriously disappeared. The missing molds were never found, and the Victoria pattern was never produced again.

== Move to Moundsville ==
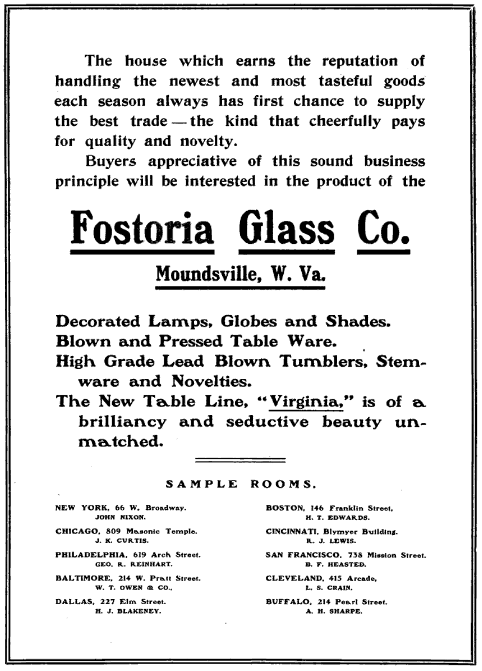
Advertisement from 1906

Northwest Ohio's gas boom was short lived, as gas shortages started occurring during the winter of 1890–91. During April 1891, Fostoria Glass executives decided to move to Moundsville, West Virginia, because of the availability of coal as a fuel for the plant—and $10,000 cash (equivalent to $358,333 in 2025) offered by the community. In addition to the cash incentive, the company was also offered a 10-year supply of coal at a low price. The move was announced in September 1891. The Fostoria plant was sold to a group of investors led by Fostoria Glass executive Otto Jaeger, and his new company was named Seneca Glass Company.

In early December, the move to Moundsville was delayed by a restraining order when several members of the Crimmel family, who owned stock in the company, filed suit. The Crimmels, who were also employees of the company, claimed shareholders should have been consulted for the move. The attempt to stop the move was unsuccessful, and the restraining order was lifted to enable the company to move by the end of the month.

The company's first Moundsville furnace had a capacity of 14 pots. (Note: Sources do not always agree on the number of pots for the first furnace. Rider says 16 pots. Lucht says 14 pots. A trade magazine describing the firm in 1912 mentioned a 14-pot furnace, but did not mention one with 16-pots.) Coal was not used directly as a fuel for the furnace. Instead, the furnace burned coal gas made from the local supply of coal. About 60 workers from the Fostoria glass works moved with the company to the Moundsville location.

== Moundsville operations ==
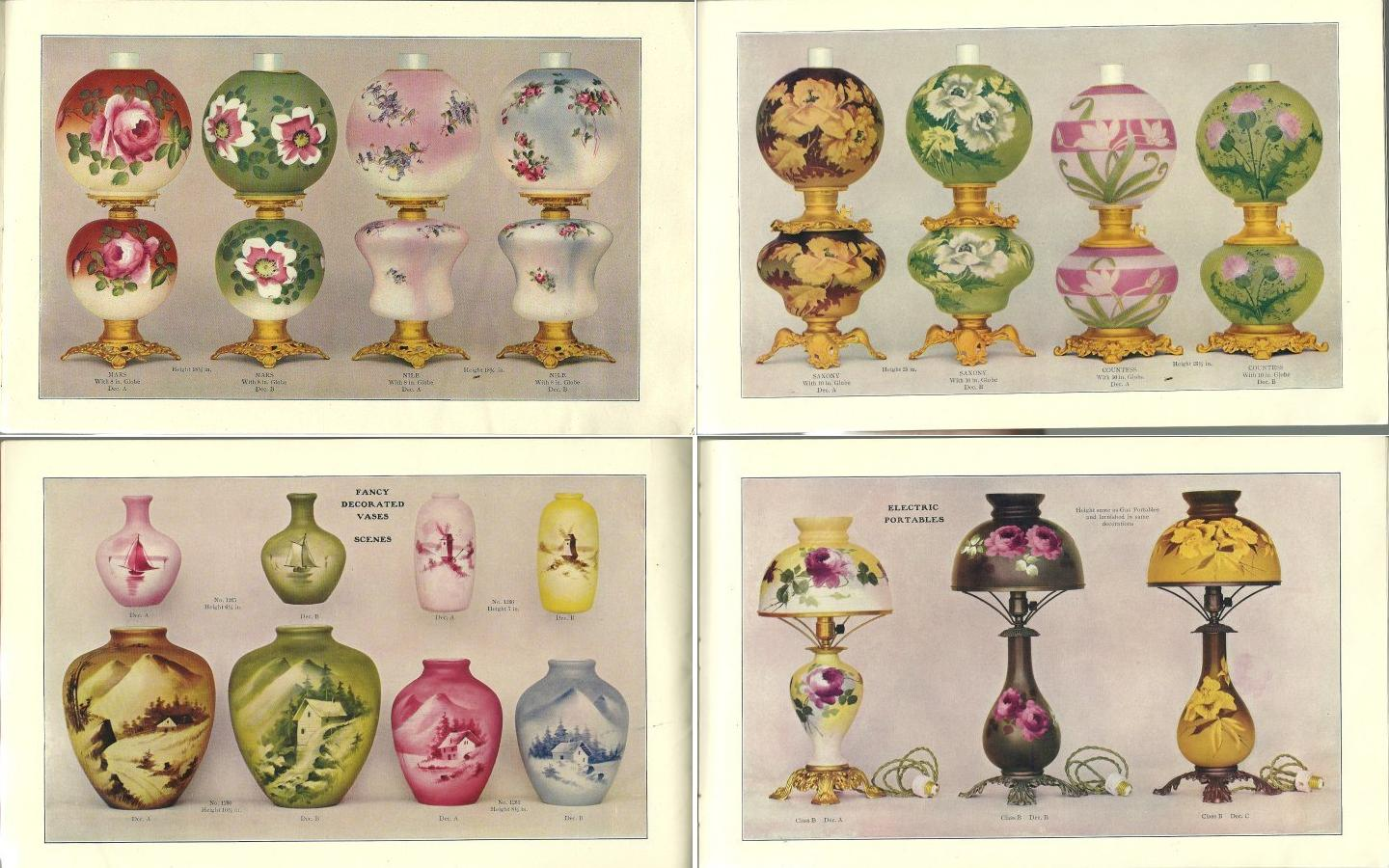
Some Fostoria oil and electric lamps and hand-decorated vases, 1904

In 1899, the company became associated with the National Glass Company, which was a corporate trust. Co-founder Lucien Martin left the firm in 1901 to work in Pittsburgh for National Glass. Another co-founder, William Brady, also moved to the Pittsburgh firm a short time later. Despite the association, Fostoria Glass Company did not become part of the National Glass Company.

William A. B. Dalzell joined the company as general manager in 1901. Dalzell was from Pittsburgh, and his initial experience in the glass industry was with Pittsburgh's Adams and Company. The Dalzell brothers had been involved with the glass business as owners and management in West Virginia and Ohio. (Note: Three Dalzell brothers (Andrew, James, and William) and a banker from Pittsburgh founded the Dalzell Brothers and Gilmore Glass Company in Wellsburg, West Virginia, during 1883. In 1888 (after the death of Andrew Dalzell) they received incentives to move their company to Findlay, Ohio. The company name was changed to Dalzell, Gilmore and Leighton, after well-known glassmaker William Leighton Jr. joined the firm from the Hobbs Glass works.) When Fostoria Glass became associated with National Glass in 1899, Dalzell was working at the trust as manager of the western department. When he joined Fostoria Glass, he brought Calvin B. Roe, who had been a bookkeeper and plant superintendent at Dalzell's Ohio plant. Dalzell quickly ascended to vice president. Under Dalzell's leadership, the Fostoria Glass Company gained a national reputation. Dalzell served as president and/or chairman from 1902 until his unexpected death in 1928.

In 1903, the company already operated two large furnaces when it added a three-story brick building that housed a new 14-pot furnace. One trade magazine believed that the addition made the company "probably the largest independent flint glass concern in the country...." By 1904, the company had 800 employees. Products made as of 1906 included decorated lamps, globes, shades, blown and pressed tableware, high grade lead blown tumblers, stemware, and novelties. At that time, a trade magazine said that the company "makes so many lines of glassware, all so perfectly, and markets its output so successfully to all classes of buyers, that no name is better known to all classes of trade."

=== Moundsville Products ===
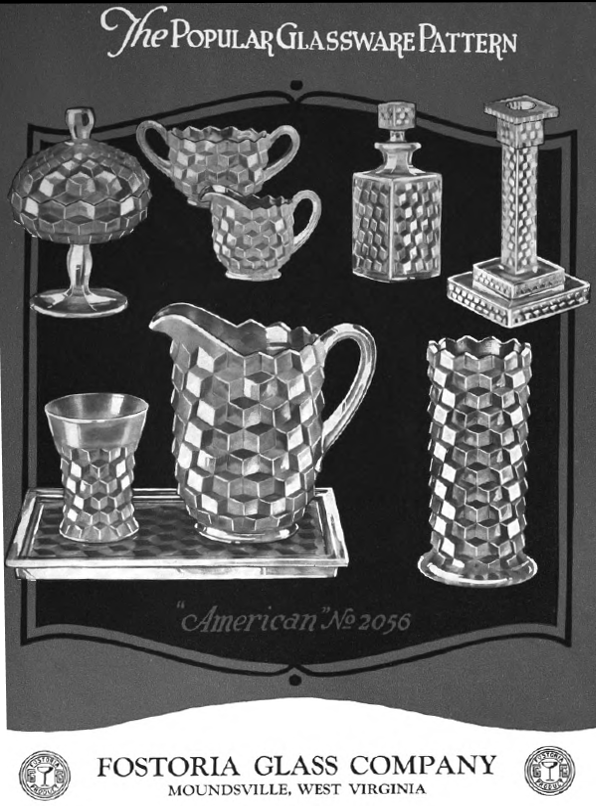
Fostoria American pattern

Fostoria was considered one of the top producers of elegant glass. However, Fostoria glassware is also found on lists of Depression glass. (Note: By the 1990s, the phrase "elegant glassware of the Depression" was being used to describe the better quality glass made at the same time as Depression glass. Thus, some of the patterns made by Fostoria using crystal glass are listed in books about Depression glass.) The company had over 1,000 patterns, including many designed by artist George Sakier. An example of a glass pattern design by Sakier is the Colony pattern 2412. This pattern was produced in crystal from the 1930s until 1983. It was reissued as Maypole in the 1980s using colored glass. Patterns can be a style of glass, an etching on the glass, or a cutting on the glass. (Note: Etching refers to using acid to alter the surface of glass. Engraving or cutting glass refers to using a tool to carve into the glass.) Some of the most successful Fostoria patterns were American, Kashmir, June, Trojan, and Versailles. Pattern 1861 was named Lincoln, and 1861 is the year Abraham Lincoln became President of the United States. The pattern was used for pressed tableware. It was pictured on the front page of the Crockery and Glass Journal on January 4, 1912.

From the beginning of the Moundsville operations until about 1915, Fostoria focused on oil lamps and products for restaurants and bars—especially stemware and tumblers. In 1915, Fostoria introduced its American pattern (pattern number 2056). This glass pattern was used for stemware and tableware, and continued to be produced until 1988. Described as "block geometric", its appearance was very different from other patterns when it was introduced. Most glass made with the American pattern was produced using Fostoria's high-quality crystal formula. American became Fostoria's most famous pattern. Management around this time was still led by W. A. B. Dalzell as company president. Vice president was C. B. Roe, and A. C. Scroggins Jr. was the secretary and treasurer. W. S. Brady was still listed as on the board of directors.

Prohibition diminished the market for commercial barware, causing Fostoria to put more emphasis on tableware for the home. Their initial target market was the higher-quality portion of the home market. In 1924, the company became the first glass manufacturer to produce complete dinner sets in crystal ware. In 1925, the company introduced dinnerware in colors. A national advertising campaign was started in 1926 to promote the complete dinnerware sets. Fostoria was also a major contributor to the creation of the bridal registry. Clear and pastel dinner sets became very popular, although expensive. This led to low cost dinner sets being made by injecting molten glass into an automated pressing mold. The product often had minor flaws, so "lacy" patterns were often included in the mold, or etched onto the glass, to hide imperfections.

By 1926, the company had 10,000 different items in its catalog, and employment before the Depression peaked at around 650 people. Among the etching patterns introduced by Fostoria during the 1920s were June, Versailles, and Trojan. The June pattern, which was made from 1928 to 1951, was etched on stemware and tableware. It is one of the rare patterns that can be dated based on color of the glass. The Versailles pattern, made from 1928 to 1943, was another etching pattern. The etchings were mostly on plates and dishes. The glass product with the etching was made in many colors. The etching pattern called Trojan was made from 1929 to 1943. The Trojan etchings were mostly on plates and dishes. Original glass colors were rose and topaz. Gold tint was used in some of the last years of production. By 1928, Fostoria was the largest producer of handmade glass in the nation.

=== Depression and post-war ===
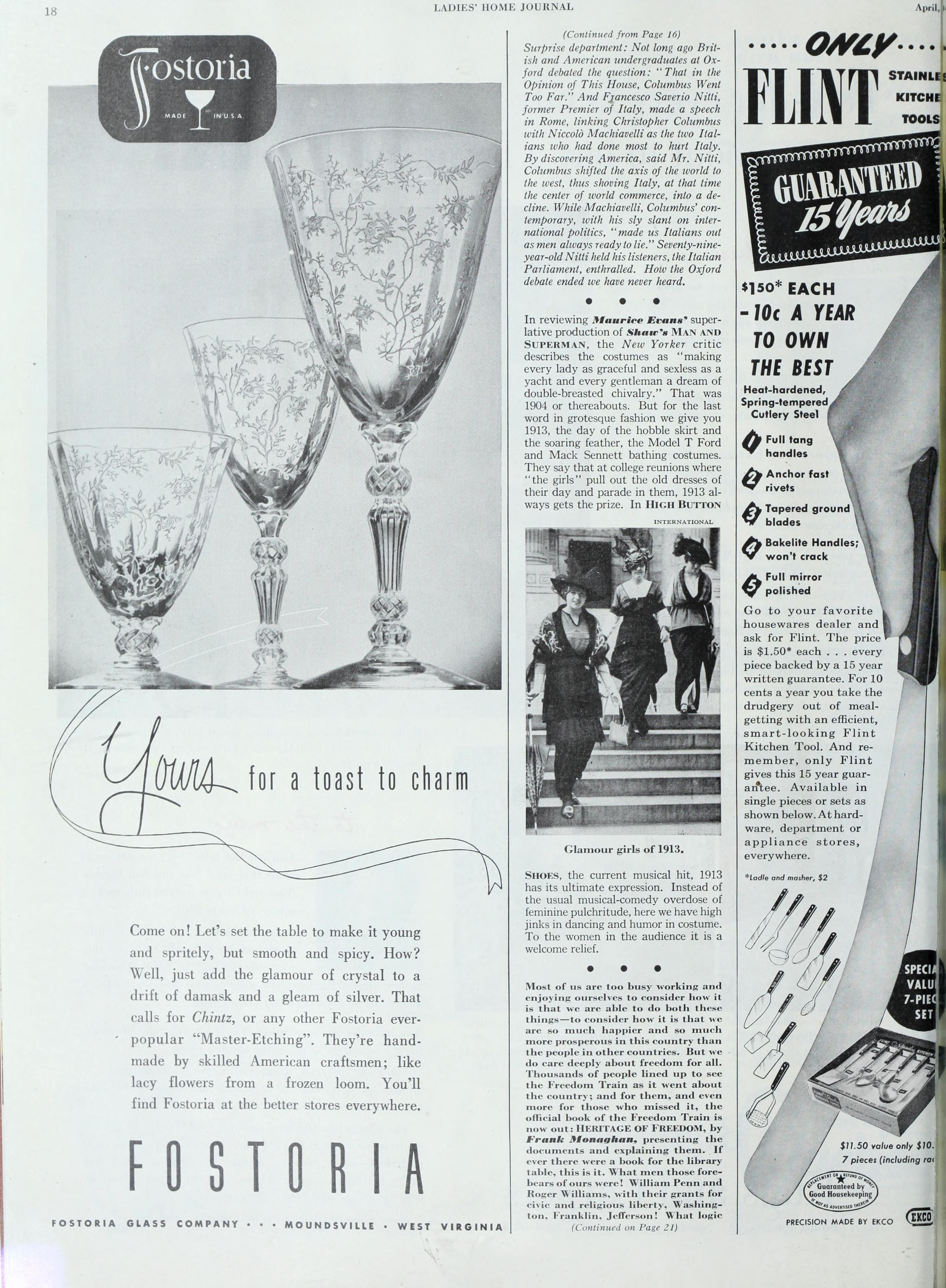
Advertisement from 1948 Ladies' Home Journal for Fostoria's Chintz pattern

During the Great Depression the company made glassware for the higher and lower cost segments of the market. Two popular Fostoria etching patterns were Navarre and Chintz. Navarre was made from 1937 until 1980. Some of the pieces were etched onto the Baroque glass pattern, but others were on more modern glass patterns. The product was originally made in crystal, but later on a few pieces with color. The Baroque glass pattern was made by Fostoria from 1937 to 1965, and used for stemware and many types of tableware. The Chintz pattern was made from 1940 to 1973. This etching pattern is a drawing of branches leaves and flowers, and was usually on the Baroque glass pattern. The Colony pattern discussed earlier was introduced around this time. (Note: Long and Seate list the Colony pattern (number 2412) as manufactured from 1940 to 1973. Schroy says the pattern was produced from the 1930s to 1983.) Another long-lived glass pattern, Century, was introduced in 1949 and made until 1982. It was used for stemware and tableware. Advertising during the 1940s included photos in the Ladies Home Journal.

Production peaked in 1950 when Fostoria's 1,000 employees manufactured over 8 million pieces of glass and crystal. A combination of quality products and national advertising helped the company continue to be the largest manufacturer of handmade glassware in the United States. Every American president from Dwight D. Eisenhower through Ronald Reagan had glassware made by Fostoria. Long-lived patterns introduced during the 1950s included Rose, Wedding Ring, and Jamestown. Rose was a cutting on stemware and tableware, and it was produced from 1951 to 1973. Wedding Ring was a decoration on stemware and tableware that was produced from 1953 to 1975. Jamestown was a glass pattern for stemware and tableware, and was used for numerous products from 1958 to 1982. The glass used was crystal and seven colors of glass: amber, blue, green, pink, amethyst, brown, and ruby. Among Jamestown stemware, ruby is valued higher than other colors by collectors. Among the milk glass patterns, Vintage was used for tableware and a few types of stemware from 1958 to 1965.

In the 1960s and 1970s, the company's marketing campaign expanded to include boutiques and display rooms within jewelry and department stores. Fostoria's top customer in 1971 was Marshall Field's. It was Marshall Field's that had created a bridal registry in 1935, which was important to manufacturers of tableware for the home. Fostoria also published its own consumer direct magazine, "Creating with Crystal", during the 1960s and 1970s. The Woodland glass pattern, not to be confused with the Woodland etching from the 1920s, was introduced in 1975 and made until 1981.

=== Morgantown ===
In 1965, Fostoria purchased the Morgantown Glassware Guild, which had also been known as the Morgantown Glass Works. Morgantown was a leader in barware and also made tableware. First Lady Jacqueline Kennedy had chosen Morgantown glassware for official White House tableware, and Fostoria sought to capitalize on this. Glassware from Morgantown could be sold as stylish entry-level tableware for the home. This segment was profitable for Fostoria for only two years, as department stores eliminated secondary sources and restaurants began switching to machine-made glass. Fostoria closed the Morgantown factory in 1971.

== Decline ==
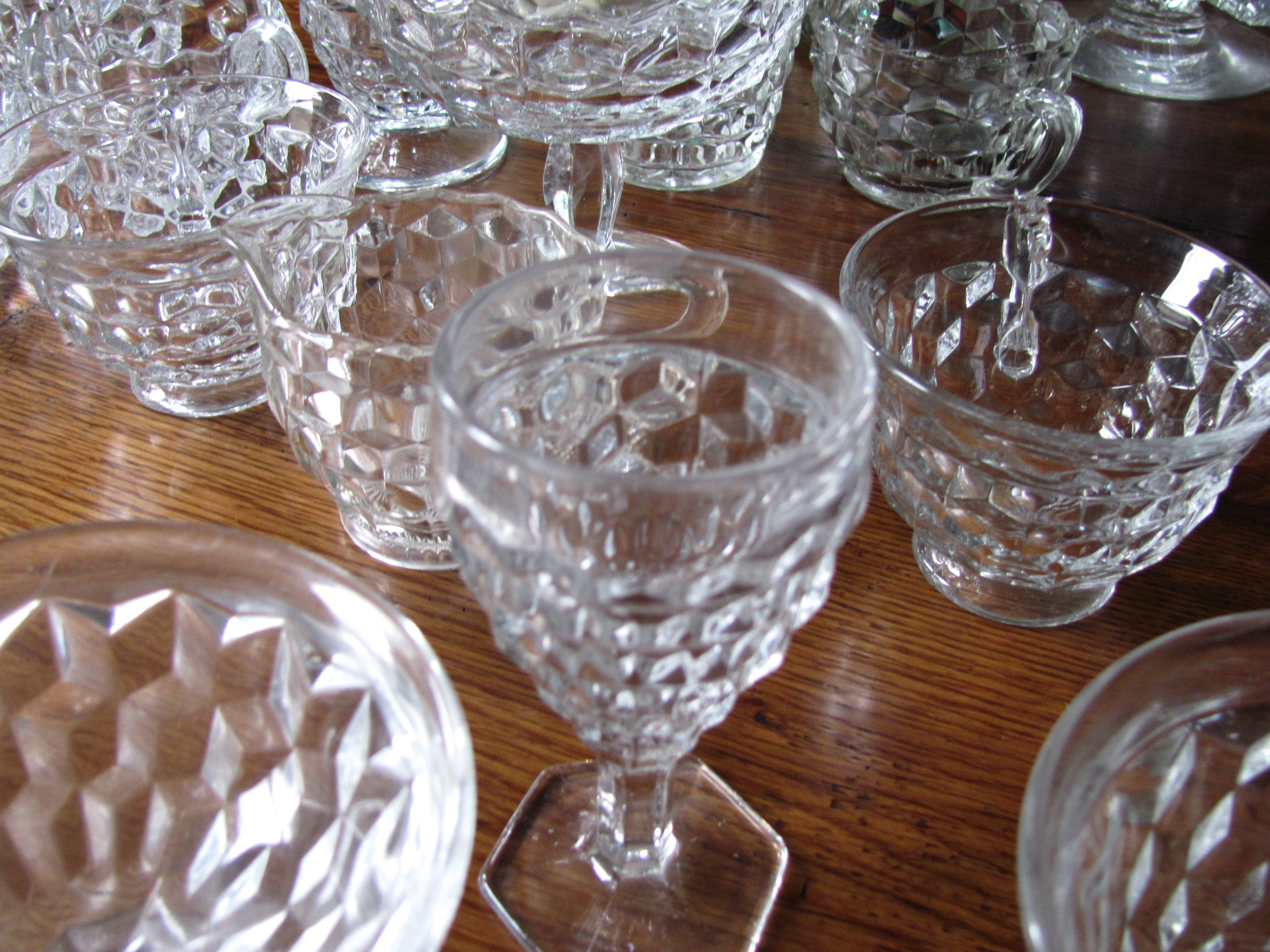
Fostoria's American pattern

In 1950, company president David B. Dalzell had said the Fostoria's competition came from "three sources: other companies in the domestic trade, imports, and automatic machinery." During the 1970s, changing preferences and a substantial increase in imports of machine-made lead-crystal tableware forced the company to make significant investments in machinery. This late attempt to be more competitive by automating more of the manufacturing process unsettled the labor force, and the company faced strikes during the early 1970s. By 1980, the company's commercial division was unprofitable.

In 1983, Fostoria sold its factory to Lancaster Colony Corporation of Columbus, Ohio. However, Lancaster Colony shut down the Fostoria Glass factory permanently on February 28, 1986. At the time, Kenneth B. Dalzell, the fourth generation of Dalzells at Fostoria Glass, was head of Fostoria operations. Dalzell purchased the assets of Viking Glass company of New Martinsville, West Virginia in April 1987, and renamed the company Dalzell-Viking. Fostoria inventory and molds were sold to several companies, and Dalzell-Viking was one of the purchasers. The American, Baroque, and Coin patterns were thereafter produced by others, including Dalzell-Viking. Some of this glassware produced at Dalzell-Viking was made by former Fostoria employees using Fostoria molds—making it difficult to differentiate from glassware made at the Fostoria plant. Dalzell-Viking closed in 1998.

== See also ==
- Heisey Glass Company
- Cambridge Glass

== Notes ==
=== References ===
- Fones-Wolf, Ken (2007). Glass towns: industry, labor and political economy in Appalachia, 1890–1930s. Urbana, IL: University of Illinois Press. ISBN 978-0-252-03131-1. OCLC 69792081.
- Kovel, Ralph M.; Kovel, Terry H. (1991). Kovels' Depression Glass & American Dinnerware Price List. New York: Crown Publishers. p. 250. ISBN 978-0-51758-444-6.
- Lechner, Mildred; Lechner, Ralph (1998). The World of Salt Shakers: Antique & Art Glass Value Guide, Volume 3. Paducah, KY: Collector Books. p. 311. ISBN 978-1-57432-065-7.
- Long, Milbra; Seate, Emily (2003). The Fostoria Value Guide. Paducah, KY: Collector Books. p. 206. ISBN 978-1-57432-583-6. OCLC 229317585.
- Lucht, Ralph K. (2011). Arnold Fiedler: Glass and Marble Maker Par Excellence. Bloomington, IN: AuthorHouse. p. 27. ISBN 978-1-456-73702-3. OCLC 761194444.
- McKelvey, Alexander T. (1903). Centennial History of Belmont county, Ohio and Representative Citizens. Chicago: Biographical Publishing Company. pp. 833. OCLC 318390043. "Centennial history of belmont county."
- Murray, Melvin L. (1992). Fostoria, Ohio Glass II. Fostoria, OH: M. L. Murray. p. 184. OCLC 27036061.
- Paquette, Jack K. (2002). Blowpipes, Northwest Ohio Glassmaking in the Gas Boom of the 1880s. Xlibris Corp. p. 559. ISBN 1-4010-4790-4. OCLC 50932436.
- Prisant, Carol (2003). Antiques Roadshow Collectibles: The Complete Guide to Collecting 20th Century Toys, Glassware, Costume Jewelry, Memorabilia, Ceramics, and More. New York: Workman Publishing. p. 589. ISBN 0-7611-2887-5.
- Revi, Albert Christian (1964). American Pressed Glass and Figure Bottles. New York: Nelson. OCLC 965803.
- Rider, Gary L.; Grubber, Karen (2018). Marshall County. Charleston, South Carolina: Arcadia Publishing. p. 127. ISBN 978-1-54022-875-8. OCLC 1038801924.
- Rinker, Harry L. (1997). Stemware of the 20th Century: The Top 200 Patterns. New York: House of Collectables. p. 195. ISBN 978-0-67660-084-1.
- Schramm, Robert W. (2004). Moundsville. Charleston, South Carolina: Arcadia. ISBN 978-0-73851-735-3. OCLC 630552674.
- Schroy, Ellen Tischbein (2001). Warman's Americana & Collectibles. Iola, WI: Krause Publications. p. 400. ISBN 978-0-87341-976-5. OCLC 299224470.
- Schroy, Ellen Tischbein; Warman (2013). Warman's Depression Glass Field Guide 2017: Values and Identification. Iola, WI: KP/F+W Media. p. 511. ISBN 978-1-44023-456-9. OCLC 1011912525.
- Schroy, Ellen Tischbein; Meyer, Pam (2017). Warman's Depression Glass Handbook 2017: Identification, Values, Pattern Guide. Iola, WI: Krause Publications. p. 320. ISBN 978-1-44024-813-9. OCLC 1011859939.
- Skrabec, Quentin R. (2007). Michael Owens and the Glass Industry. Gretna, LA: Pelican Publishing. OCLC 137341537.
- Sullivan, Amy (2010). Schroeder's Antiques Price Guide. Padacuh, KY: Collector Books. p. 607. ISBN 978-1-57432-632-1. OCLC 433147612.
- United States Department of Commerce, Bureau of Foreign and Domestic Commerce (1917). The Glass Industry. Report on the Cost of Production of Glass in the United States. Washington: Government Printing Office. p. 41. OCLC 5705310. "Glass blower."
- Venable, Charles L.; Jenkins, Tom; Denker, Ellen P.; Grier, Katherine C. (2000). China and Glass in America, 1880-1980: from Tabletop to TV Tray. Dallas: Dallas Museum of Art. ISBN 978-0-81096-692-5. OCLC 905439701.
