= Early American molded glass =

Early American molded glass refers to glass functional and decorative objects, such as bottles and dishware, that were manufactured in the United States in the 19th century. The objects were produced by blowing molten glass into a mold, thereby causing the glass to assume the shape and pattern design of the mold. When a plunger rather than blowing is used, as became usual later, the glass is technically called pressed glass. Common blown molded tableware items bearing designs include salt dishes, sugar bowls, creamers, celery stands, decanters, and drinking glasses.

Household items, other than dishware, made using the three-mold method include inkwells, oil lamps, birdcage fountains, hats, medicine and perfume bottles, and witch balls. Whiskey flasks bearing unique designs were made in two part molds. Undecorated bottles used as containers for a variety of liquids were blown into square molds to give them corners so they could be packed into compartments of wooden cases.

== History ==
After the War of 1812, American glass manufacturers began using molds as an inexpensive way to produce glassware similar in appearance to the much more expensive cut glass that was imported from Britain and Ireland. A dearth of skilled glassblowers may have also led to the increased use of molds. Blown molded glass was popular for about twenty years before it was superseded by pressed glass.

== Production ==
The process of blowing molten glass into a mold made of clay is known to have been employed in Syrian workshops as early as the 4th century BCE. Romans adopted the technique in the 1st century CE. Molds used in 19th-century European and American glass factories were cast in iron or bronze. They were made by professional mold manufacturers in many large United States cities and were universally available. Although no intact molds have been found, fragments of molds have been excavated at glass manufacturing sites in Sandwich, Massachusetts and Kent and Mantua, Ohio.

The mold, which was placed on the floor or below floor level, was not three molds, but one mold in three parts. It was made of hinged sections that could be opened and closed by means of a foot- or hand-operated treadle. One of the vertical walls of the mold was permanently fastened to the base, and the other walls were attached to it by removable pins. Designs were cut into the inside walls of all mold parts. Some molds impressed a pattern on the object and base, while others omitted the base. Most molds were in three parts, but could also be constructed of two or four parts. Regardless of the number of parts of a mold, all objects produced in a mold are called three-mold glass.

The process of molding was just the initial step in the manufacture of three-mold glass. After removal from the mold, the glass was expanded by means of additional blowing. The object was then cracked off at the rim and hand finished by grinding and polishing. Pitcher rims, decanter necks and bases all required hand work. In New England, pieces were often finished with threaded lips. Handles were also added after removal from the mold. Lamps, candlesticks and vases were pressed in separate parts and fused together while still hot. Finished pieces were fire polished by reheating in the furnace, which softened the pattern and gave the piece a diffuse brilliance.

Between 1820 and 1840, one hundred glass factories are known to have been in operation in the U.S. It is known from descriptions in advertisements and invoices that the Boston and Sandwich Glass Company and the New England Glass Company were major producers of blown three-mold glass. Most colorless glass was made by the New England Glass Company in Cambridge, Massachusetts. Also producing three-mold glass in New England was the Boston Crown Glass Manufactory, as well as the Quincy Glass Works in Massachusetts, which made snuff bottles molded to a square form. Three-piece molds were used from 1815 to 1835 in midwestern houses, most notably in Ohio. Marlboro Street Factory in Keene, NH manufactured dark green and amber bottle glass and was known for the manufacture of inkwells. In New York and New Jersey, famous glass manufacturers of blown three-mold glass include the Mount Vernon Glass Company, Brooklyn Flint Glass Works, and Jersey City Glassworks. The Coventry, CT Glass Company was also a manufacturer of three-mold items. It is believed that glass factories in Pittsburgh, Philadelphia and Baltimore also produced three-mold glassware, but since excavation is not possible, no proof exists. Some foreign molded three-part glass manufactured in England, Ireland (two part molds) and France (three part molds) in the early 19th century, is sometimes mistaken for American glass.

== Colors and patterns ==
Colors of blown three-mold glass are relatively rare, however, some objects in deep gray-blue, sapphire blue, olive green, yellow-green, citron, aquamarine and amethyst-purple have survived. Items made of colorless glass and green bottle glass are most commonly seen.

The three main categories of three-mold glass patterns are Geometric, Arch and Baroque. Diamond patterning, also known as diamond diapering or diamond quilting, is the most common Geometric design found on molded glass. Other common designs include ribbed and popcorn. Items bearing Geometric designs are the most numerous and include tableware, such as decanters, stoppers, cruets, casters, condiment sets, pitchers, punch bowls, pans, dishes, preserve dishes, mugs, tumblers, wine glasses, celery glasses and salts, and doll dishes. Also in the Geometric category is ribbing, which could be imprinted on the object vertically, horizontally, diagonally or in a swirled pattern. Ribs can be narrow or wide, differently spaced, rounded, flat or inverted. Arch, the most rare of the three designs, uses a series of Gothic (pointed) or Roman (rounded) arches. Sometimes both types of arches appear. Baroque patterning includes Shell (rocaille) ornaments with broad, rounded, vertical ribbing and often combined with design of a band of palmettes or trefoils. Other Baroque designs include stars in circles, rosettes, thick chains (guilloches), hearts, a horn of plenty, pinwheels, and fluid drapery.

Designs imprinted on whiskey bottles include political events, celebrities, the American eagle, horn of plenty, head of Lady Liberty, agricultural symbols and Masonic emblems. A favorite whiskey bottle illustration was the head of George Washington under which was inscribed a text. Two texts found on bottles with the Washington design are “The Father of His Country,” and “I Have Endeavor’d to do my Duty.” Lafayette with DeWitt Clinton were popular whiskey bottle designs at the time of the opening of the Erie Canal. Other political figures include General Jackson and Zachary Taylor. Taylor flasks have been discovered with the captions, “Corn for the world,” and “Gen’l Taylor Never Surrenders.” Images of John Quincy Adams, Henry Clay and William Henry Harrison also appear on flasks.

=== Distinguishing characteristics ===
The main characteristic that sets apart three-mold ware from pressed glass is that the inverse of the pattern of three-mold glass can be felt on the inside of the object. Pressed glass is patterned only on the exterior and smooth inside. Pressed glass, termed “mold-pressed,” has an interior form independent of the exterior, in contrast to mold-blown glass, whose interior corresponds to the outer form. Plates, lamp bases and door knobs were usually made of pressed glass.

Molded glass can be easily distinguished from cut glass, since cut glass sparkles with prismatic brilliance as the sharp angles of the cuts in the glass break up light into all colors of the spectrum, and molded glass has a softer, more rounded surface which transmits a silvery, more luminous gleam. Tiny raised hairline seams where the mold sections were joined and a slight displacement in parts of the pattern are often seen on molded glass.

== Nomenclature ==
Although Early American glassware advertisements are often found using the terms “moulded” and “prest” interchangeably, pattern-molded (pressed) and blown three-mold glass were manufactured by means of two distinct processes. Blown three-mold glass was sometimes called “prest” (pressed) because the glass was blown into a mold and “impressed” with a design. Various names for blown three mold glass have been used by collectors since its rediscovery in the early 20th century. It was first called “Stiegel glass” by collector Frederick W. Hunter because a few pieces of three-mold glass were included in his Stiegel collection. Later, it was called Stoddard glass, after the name of a factory that, in fact, never made three-mold glass. In the 1920s, American glass writer Rhea Mansfield Knittle unsuccessfully tried to introduce the term “insufflated.” Blown-three-mold pieces might also be called “blown molded” as well as “pre-blown-three-mold” because molten glass was partially inflated before it was inserted into the mold. The names currently used by collectors are three-mold or blown three-mold.
