= Seneca Glass Company Building =

- U.S. National Register of Historic Places
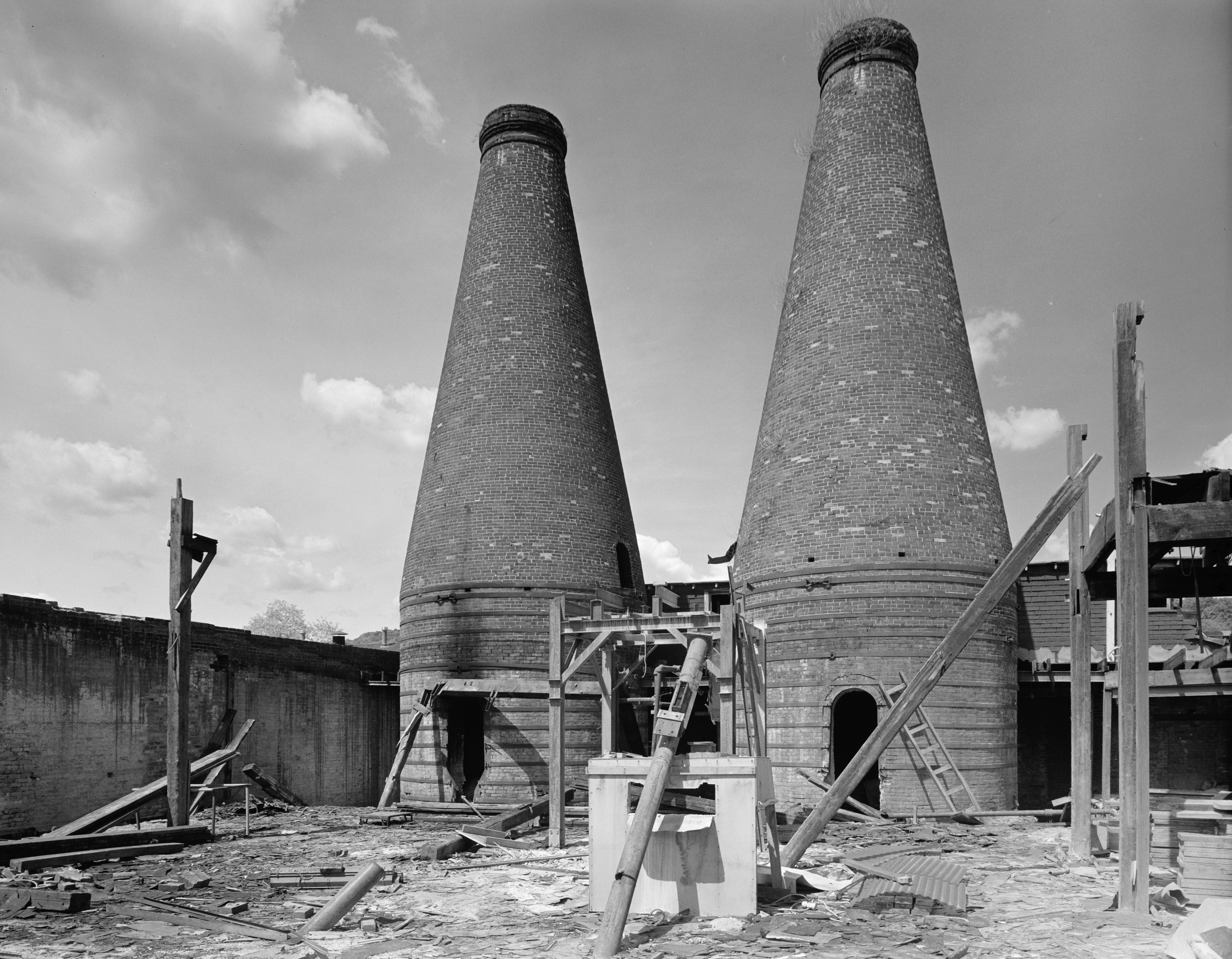
- Seneca Glass Company Factory ovens, 1974

- Location within West Virginia Location within the United States
- Location: 709 Beechurst Ave., Morgantown, West Virginia
- Coordinates: 39°38′28″N 79°57′44″W
- Area: 2.7 acres (1.1 ha)
- Built: 1897
- NRHP reference No.: 85003214
- Added to NRHP: December 19, 1985

Seneca Glass Company Building, now called Seneca Center, is a historic glass factory located at Morgantown, Monongalia County, West Virginia. It was built by the Seneca Glass Company in 1896–1897, and is an industrial complex of work areas, all connected by doors, passageways, or bridges. A fire in 1902, destroyed much of the interior of the original brick part of the complex. After the fire, Elmer F. Jacobs designed the new two-story replacement, a new Needle Etching Room in a separate building connected by a bridge, and the reconstruction of the Grinding, Glazing, and Cutting areas. A large addition was built in 1947. The building features a conical brick stack that projects 36 feet above the roofline of the Furnace / Blowing Room. The complex was the home of one of the finest hand-blown, hand-cut and etched, lead glass factories in the world. After the factory closed in 1983, it was adapted for commercial use.

It was listed on the National Register of Historic Places in 1985.
