= Goofus glass =

Type of decorated pressed glass

Goofus glass is an American term for pressed glass that was decorated with unfired enamel paint in the early 20th century by several prominent glass factories. It contrasts with enamelled glass, where the enamel is fired, making the paint far more durable. Because it was mass produced and relatively cheap, it was given as premiums with purchases and awarded as prizes at fairs. It was the first carnival glass, preceding the iridized product known today as carnival glass.

Articles produced included plates, bowls, vases, oil lamps, dresser sets, salt and pepper shakers and candle holders. Common colors were red, green and gold, the latter the most common.

Major producers included Indiana Glass Company, Dugan Diamond Company and H. Northwood. These companies produced pieces that consisted of lines of pressed glass known as intaglio and painted opalescent glass.

The term "goofus" now refers more to the technique of using unfired enamel paints on a piece of glass rather than to the glass itself. The term generally excludes milk glass and painted jewelry, items produced after the 1930s, and items produced outside the US.
