= George Sakier =

American artist

George Sakier (1897–1988) was an American artist and industrial designer. A man of multiple talents, he originally studied at the engineering school of Columbia University and Pratt Institute. Having composed the text Machine Design and Descriptive Geometry at age 19, he went on to work as a camouflage technician during World War I. After the war he continued to work as an artist, combining technology with classicism.

In the 1920s, Sakier moved to Paris where he wrote articles on European art for American magazines and on U.S. engineering for European journals. For the fledgling international literary magazine Broom, where he also served as an art director, he authored (using the family name Sacken) an essay on Mayan art. This essay stimulated the rescue of a Mayan collection from the cellar of the Trocadèro in Paris. He also worked in art direction for Vogue, Harper's Bazaar, and Modes and Manners. During his tenure at Vogue, he provided the African mask featured in Man Ray's iconic photographic Noire et blanche.

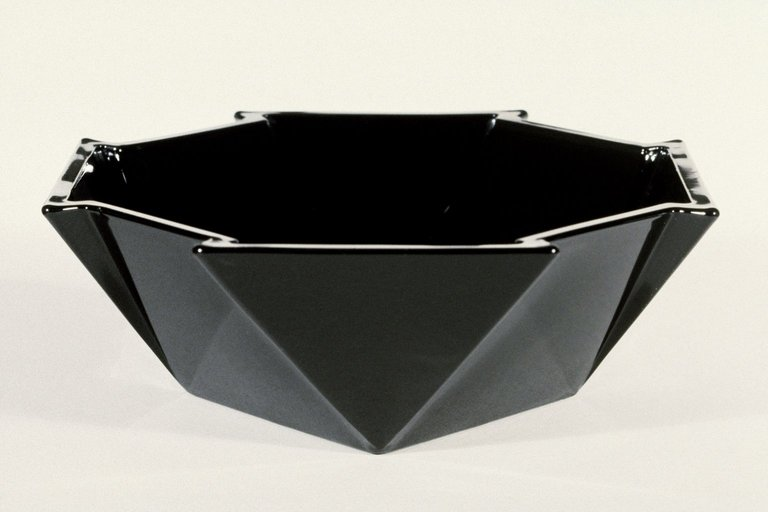
Bowl, ca. 1930. Brooklyn Museum

Sakier worked in the medium of glassware. From 1929 until 1979, he worked as the primary consultant for Fostoria Glass Company. Sakier was also a proponent and the creator of the company's Art Deco most progressive designs.

Sakier was also an accomplished painter, the metier about which he was most passionate. His paintings were shown in the Julien Levy Gallery in New York City in 1932. His works include "Red Mesa", "Seascape #011", and "Collage CO08". After he amassed his fortune from his industrial designs, he moved permanently to Paris where he pursued this passion until his death in 1988.

== Legacy ==
Yale University has a George Sakier Memorial Prize for excellence in photography. The Industrial Design Department at his alma mater, Pratt Institute, awards the George Sakier Merit Scholarship to students for excellence in color theory. His glasswork is in numerous collections, including the Metropolitan Museum of Art, the Brooklyn Museum of Art, Cooper Hewitt, and the Birmingham Museum of Art, among others.

== Sources ==
- Sakier museum reproduction
- Small Biography
- George Sakier, Industrial Designers of America
