= Pressed glass =

Form of glass made by pressing molten glass into a mold using a plunger

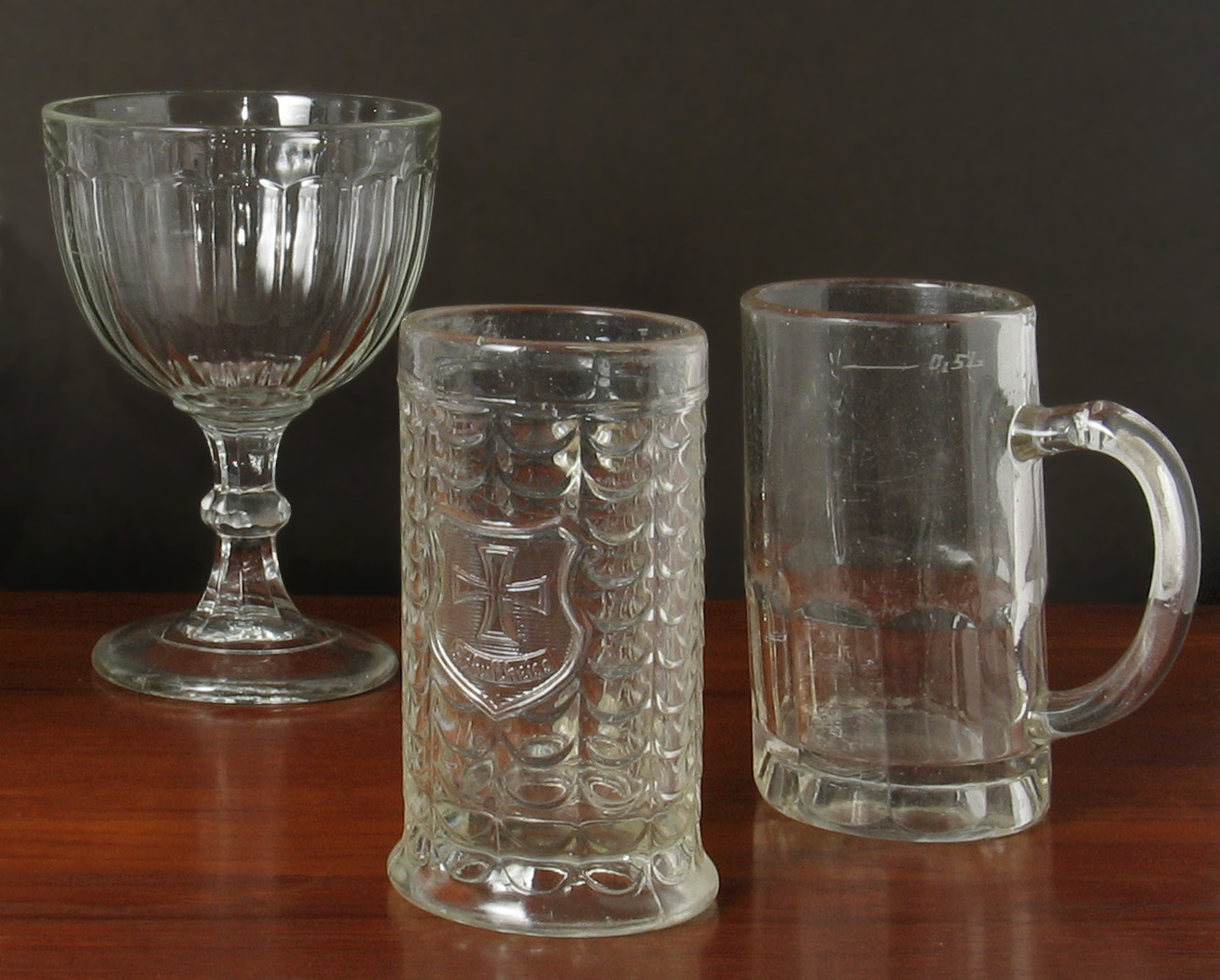
Pressed glass drinking glasses from the early 20th century

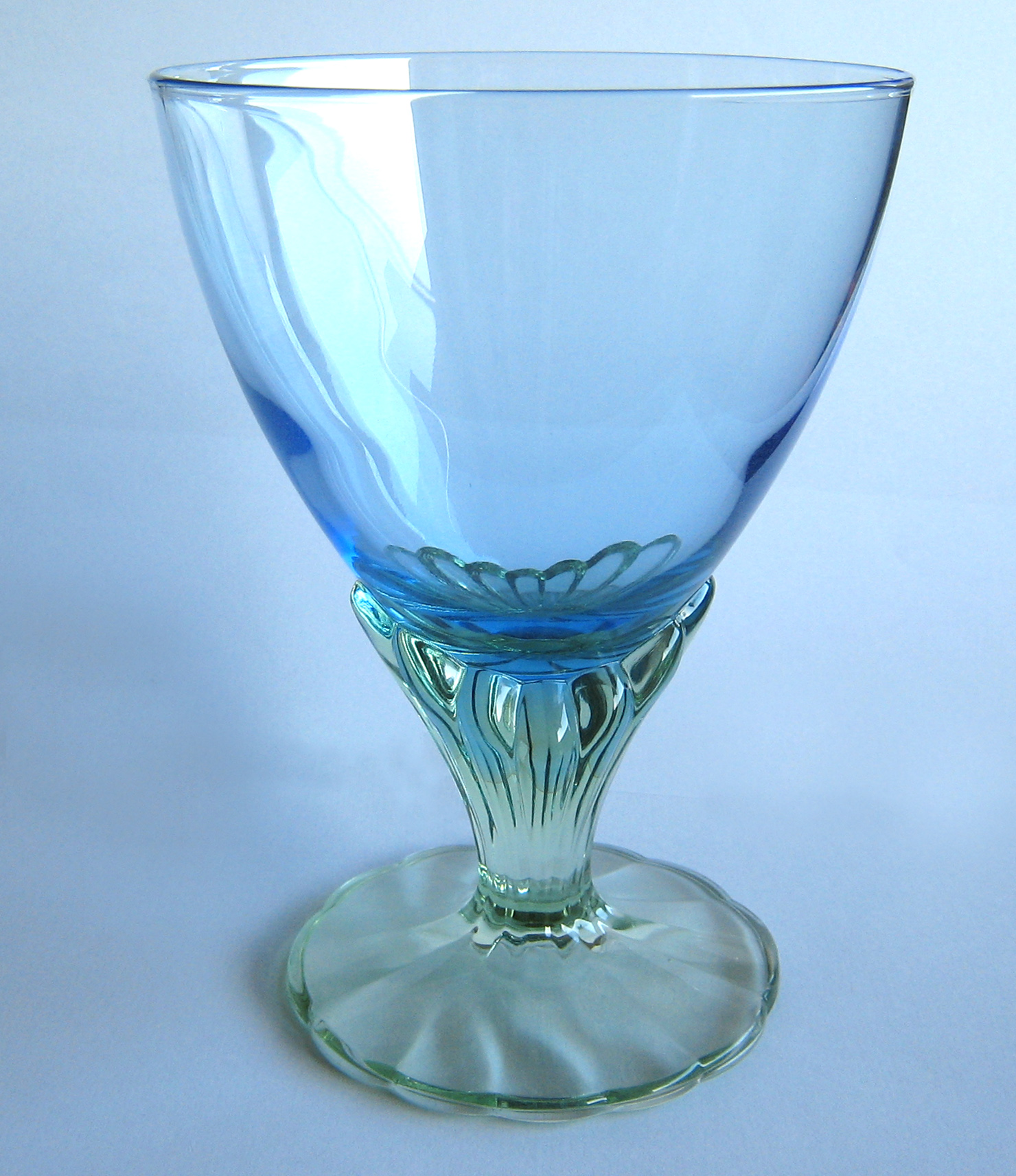
Art Deco glass with pressed glass foot, 1920s

Pressed glass (or pattern glass) is a form of glass made by pressing molten glass into a mold using a plunger. Although hand pressed glass has existed for over 1,000 years, the use of a machine for pressing was first patented by Pittsburgh glass man John P. Bakewell in 1825 to make knobs for furniture.

The technique was developed in the United States from the 1820s and in Europe, particularly France, Bohemia, and Sweden from the 1830s. By the mid-19th century, most inexpensive mass-produced glassware was pressed (1850–1910). One type of pressed glass is carnival glass. Painted pressed glass produced in the early 20th century is often called goofus glass. The method is also used to make beads.

== History ==
It is not known who invented the full-size machine press but it also was probably developed at the New England Glass Company about 1827. It required two people to operate.

== See also ==
- Millefiori
