= Elegant glass =

American glassware made in the Depression Era

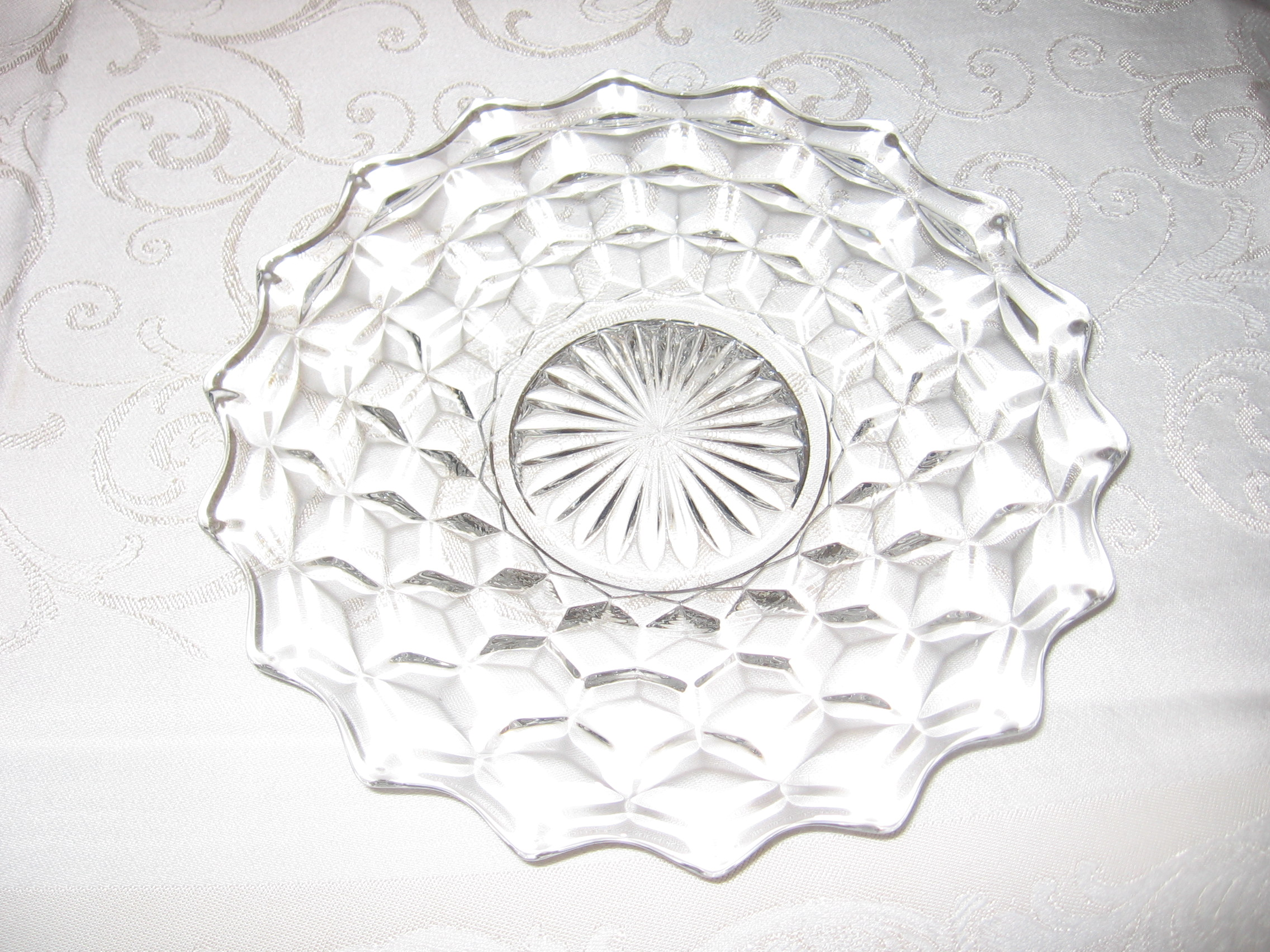
Fostoria plate.

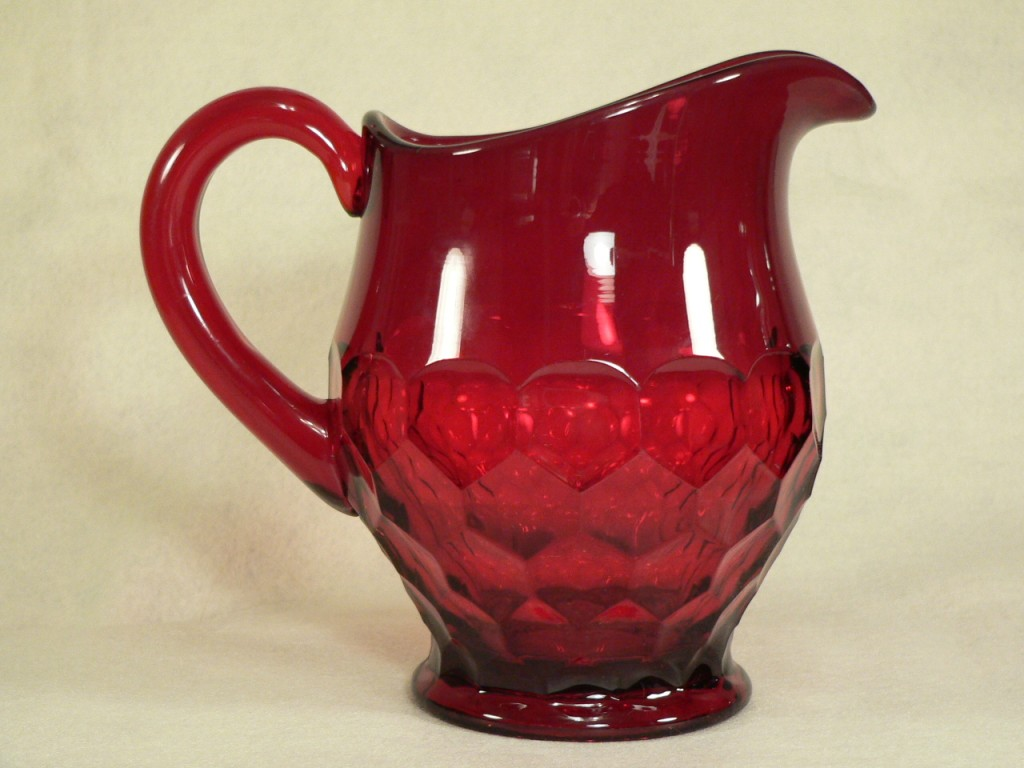
Duncan Glass Company's Georgian pattern on a pitcher in ruby red

Elegant glass is high quality glassware created in the United States during the Depression Era. It was sold for high prices in department stores and given as wedding gifts. Although part of the Depression Era, it is considered by most to be a separate category or sub category of Depression glass. When new, Elegant glass would cost more than standard Depression glass, because it was at least partially handmade, had a cleaner finish, and more vibrant colors. From the 1920s through the 1950s, Elegant glass was an alternative to fine china. Most of the Elegant glassware manufacturers closed by the end of the 1950s, and cheap glassware and imported china took its place.

== Manufacturing process ==
Elegant glass was at least partially hand made during production. Elegant glass manufacturers produced vibrant colors that varied far more than Depression Glass. Shades of red, blue, green, amber, yellow, smoke, amethyst, and pink were produced. An easy way to compare the difference in color quality is to take a look at a piece of cobalt Elegant glass and place it alongside a piece of cobalt Depression Glass. The intensity of the former piece is quite evident. Pressed Elegant glass was fire polished to get rid of the flaws in the glass. The normal flaws found in pressed glass – straw marks, raised seams, etc. were removed. The bases of bowls, platters, etc. were ground so they would sit evenly on a table. Many patterns of Elegant glass were embellished with acid etching, cutting, enamel decoration, gold encrustation, platinum and gold trim.

== Sale and marketing ==
Unlike depression glass that was often given away, Elegant glass was sold in the finer stores. Sometimes it was marketed as wedding or special occasion patterns. It was offered as an alternative to china and crystal which were still imported due to manufacturing costs and were incredibly expensive. Many consumers purchased Elegant glass and placed it on display, only using it for very special occasions.

== Products ==
Elegant glass patterns had a wide range of items available including:

=== Tableware ===
Tableware included plates, bowls, platters, sherbets, salt and pepper shakers, compotes, creamers, sugar bowls, epergnes, mayonnaise bowls, place holders, baskets, candy dishes, cruets, bells, candlesticks, cheese stands, bread and butter plates, baskets, bon bon trays, jam/jelly jars, tidbit trays, nut dishes, celery dishes, pickle dishes, lamps, cracker jars, oil and vinegar bottles, marmalade jars, and vases.

=== Barware ===
Barware includes card trays, milk pitchers, jugs, cigarette holders, coasters, cordial glasses, cocktails glasses, decanters, bitters bottles, ice buckets, water goblets, wine glasses, ashtrays, and muddlers.

== Manufacturers and patterns ==
Companies that made Elegant glass and the patterns they produced.

- Cambridge Glass Company
  - Apple Blossom
  - Byzantine
  - Candlelight
  - Caprice
  - Chantilly
  - Cleo
  - Chrysanthemum
  - Daffodil
  - Decagon
  - Diane
  - Elaine
  - Gadroon
  - Gloria
  - Imperial Hunt Scene
  - Imperial Victorian
  - Lorna
  - Mt. Vernon
  - Portia
  - Rosalie
  - Rose Point
  - Seashell
  - Springtime
  - Statuesque
  - Tally Ho
  - Valencia
  - Wildflower
- Central Glass Company
  - Morgan
- Consolidated Glass Company
  - Ruba Rombic
- Diamond
  - Charade
- Duncan & Miller
  - Buttercup
  - Canterbury
  - Caribbean
  - Dover
  - First Love
  - Nautical
  - Sandwich
  - Spiral Flutes
  - Terrace
- Fenton Glass Company
  - Lincoln Inn
  - Ming
  - Rose Crest
  - Silver Crest
  - Sophisticated Ladies
- Fostoria
  - American
  - American Lady
  - Baroque
  - Chintz
  - Colony
  - Contour
  - Coronet
  - Garland
  - New Garland
  - Fairfax No. 2375
  - Heather
  - Hermitage
  - Kashmir
  - Manor (clear, topaz, green and wisteria)
  - Navarre
  - Pioneer
  - Romance
  - Rosalie
  - Rose
  - Royal
  - Seville
  - Sun Ray
  - Trojan
  - Vesper
  - Versailles
- Heisey Company
  - Carcassonne
  - Charter Oak
  - Chintz
  - Crystolite
  - Empress
  - Ipswich
  - Lariat
  - Lodestar
  - Minuet
  - New Era
  - Octagon
  - Old Colony
  - Old Sandwich
  - Old Williamsburg
  - Orchid
  - Plantation
  - Pleat & Panel
  - Queen Ann
  - Ridgeleigh
  - Rosalie
  - Saturn
  - Stanhope
  - Triplex
  - Twist
  - Victorian
  - Waverly
  - Yeoman
- Imperial Glass Company
  - Candlewick
  - Cape Cod
  - Lily of the Valley
  - Mt. Vernon
  - Provincial
  - Tradition
- Morgantown
  - Biscayne
  - Rosalie
  - Sunrise Medallion
- New Martinsville Glass Company
  - Hostmaster (Repeal)
  - Florentine
  - Florentine (with Meadow Wreath Etch)
  - Janice
  - Moondrops
  - Mt. Vernon
  - Prelude
  - Radiance
- Paden City Glass
  - Black Forest
  - Crow's Foot
  - Daisy
  - Gazebo
- Pairpoint
  - Grape
- Tiffin Glass Company
  - Cadena
  - Cherokee Rose
  - Classic
  - Flanders
  - Fuchsia
  - June
  - June Night
  - Mt. Vernon

== Etching patterns ==
Companies and artists that designed acid etching, cutting, enamel decoration, gold encrustation, platinum and gold trim but did not create glass.

- Lotus
  - Bridal Bouquet
  - Flanders

== Pattern gallery ==
Cambridge

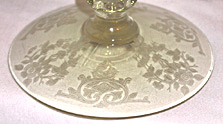
Apple Blossom

Caprice

Chantilly

Chrysanthemum

Cleo

Diane

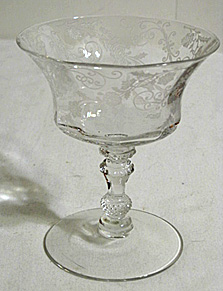
Elaine

Gloria

Gradroon

Lorna

Magnolia

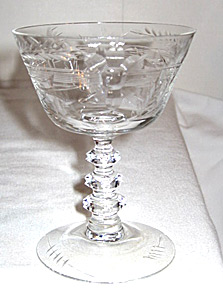
Maryland

Rosalie

Rosepoint

Seashell

Springtime

Wedgewood

Diamond Glass Company

Charade

New Martinsville Glass Company

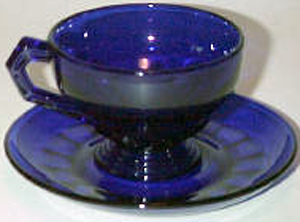
Hostmaster or Repeal

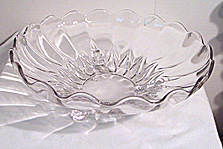
Janice

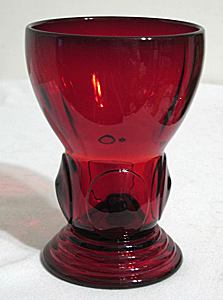
Moondrops

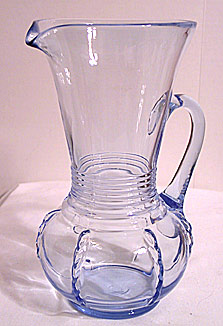
Radiance

== See also ==
- Carnival glass
- Depression glass
- Goofus glass
- Milk glass
- Pressed glass
- Satin glass
- Uranium glass
