= Depression glass =

American and Canadian pressed glassware made in the 1930s

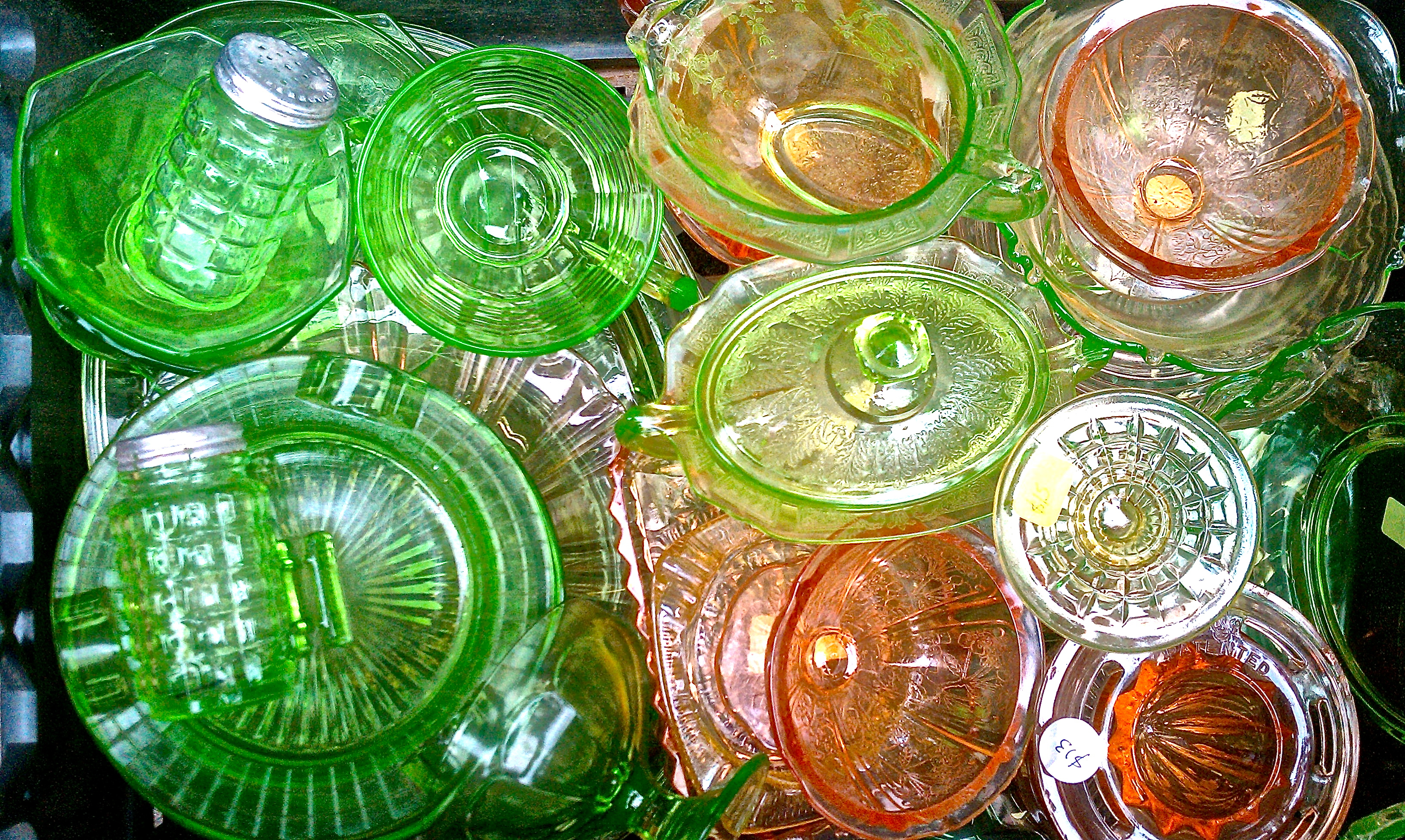
Depression ware

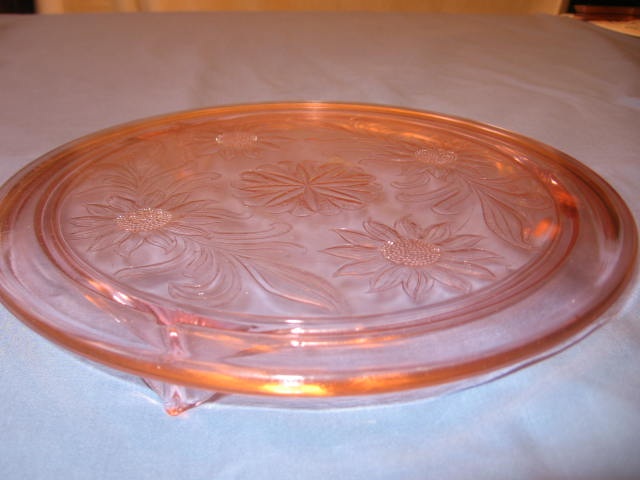
Pink sunflower patterned depression cake plate

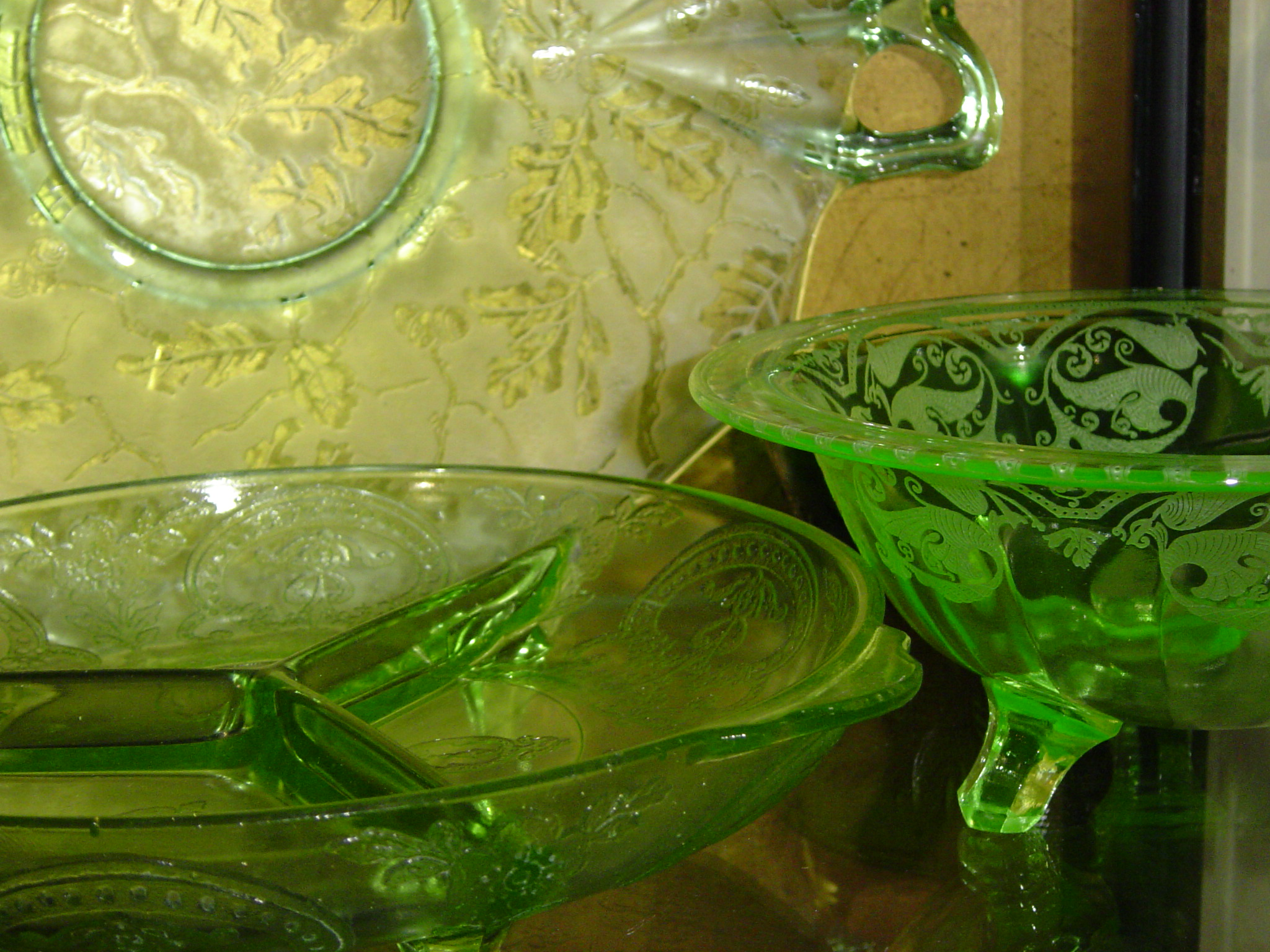
Green patterned Depression glass pieces

Depression glass is glassware made in the period 1929–1939, often clear or colored translucent machine-made glassware that was distributed free, or at low cost, in the United States and Canada around the time of the Great Depression. Depression glass is so called because collectors generally associate mass-produced glassware in pink, yellow, crystal, green, and blue with the Great Depression in America.

== History ==
The Quaker Oats Company, and other food manufacturers and distributors, put a piece of glassware in boxes of food, as an incentive to purchase. Some movie theaters and businesses handed out pieces to patrons.

Most of this glassware was made in the Ohio River Valley of the United States, where access to raw materials and power made manufacturing inexpensive in the first half of the 20th century. More than twenty manufacturers made more than 100 patterns, and entire dinner sets were made in some patterns. Common colors are clear (crystal), pink, pale blue, green, and amber. Less common colors include yellow (canary), ultramarine, jadeite (opaque pale green), delphite (opaque pale blue), cobalt blue, red (ruby and royal ruby), black, amethyst, monax, and white (milk glass). Some depression glass is uranium glass.

Although of marginal quality, Depression glass has been highly collectible since the 1960s. Due to its popularity as a collectible, it is becoming more scarce on the open market. Rare pieces may sell for several hundred dollars. Some manufacturers continued to make popular patterns after World War II, or introduced similar patterns, which are also collectible. Popular and expensive patterns and pieces have been reproduced, and reproductions are still being made.

== Manufacturers and patterns ==
- Anchor Hocking Glass Company
  - Forest Green
  - Manhattan
  - Oyster and Pearl
  - Queen Mary
  - Royal Ruby
  - Teardrop and Dot
- Belmont Tumbler Company
  - Bowknot
  - Rose Cameo
- Dell Glass Company
  - Tulip
- Diamond Glass-Ware Company
  - Victory
  - Economy
  - Round Robin
- Federal Glass Company
  - Colonial Fluted
  - Columbia
  - Diana
  - Georgian
  - Madrid
  - Mayfair
  - Normandie
  - Optic Paneled
  - Parrot
  - Patrician
  - Raindrops
  - Rosemary
  - Sharon
  - Twisted Optic
- Fry Glass
- Hazel-Atlas Glass Company
  - Aurora
  - Beehive
  - Cloverleaf
  - Colony
  - Colonial Block
  - Crisscross
  - Florentine No.1
  - Florentine No.2
  - Fruits
  - Moderntone
  - New Century
  - Newport
  - Ovide
  - Ribbon
  - Roxana
  - Royal Lace
  - Ships
  - Starlight
  - Wagon Wheel
- Hocking Glass Company
  - Ballerina
  - Block Optic
  - Circle
  - Colonial
  - Coronation
  - Fire-King dinnerware
    - Philbe
  - Fortune
  - Hobnail
  - Lake Como
  - Mayfair
  - Miss America
  - Old Cafe
  - Old Colony
  - Princess
  - Ring
  - Roulette
  - Spiral
  - Vitrock
  - Waterford
- Imperial Glass Company
  - Beaded Block
  - Diamond Quilted
  - Laced Edge
  - Little Jewel
  - Molly
  - Twisted Optic
- Indiana Glass Company
  - Avocado
  - Cracked Ice
  - Indiana Custard
  - Lorain
  - No.610, Pyramid
  - No.612, Horseshoe
  - No.616, Vernon
  - No.618, Pineapple and Floral
  - Old English
  - Park Lane
  - Sandwich
  - Tea Room
- Jeannette Glass Company
  - Adam
  - Cherry Blossom
  - Cube
  - Doric
  - Doric and Pansy
  - Floral
  - Hex Optic
  - Homespun
  - Iris
  - Sierra
  - Sunburst
  - Sunflower
  - Swirl
  - Windsor
- Jenkins
  - Ocean Wave
- Lancaster Glass Company
  - Jubilee
  - Landrum
  - Patrick
- Liberty Works
  - American Pioneer
- MacBeth-Evans Glass Company
  - American Sweetheart
  - Chinex Classic
  - Cremax
  - Dogwood
  - Petalware
  - S Pattern
  - Thistle
- McKee Glass Company
  - Laurel
  - Rock Crystal
- Paden City Glass Company
  - Cupid
  - Gothic Garden
  - Orchid
  - Peacock and Wild Rose
  - Peacock Reverse
- L. E. Smith Glass Company
  - By Cracky
  - Mt. Pleasante
  - Pebbled Rim
  - Romanesque
- U.S. Glass Company
  - Aunt Polly
  - Cherryberry
  - Floral and Diamond Band
  - Flower Garden with Butterflies
  - Primo
  - Strawberry
  - Swirl
- Westmoreland Glass Company
  - Della Robbia
  - English Hobnail
  - Woolworth

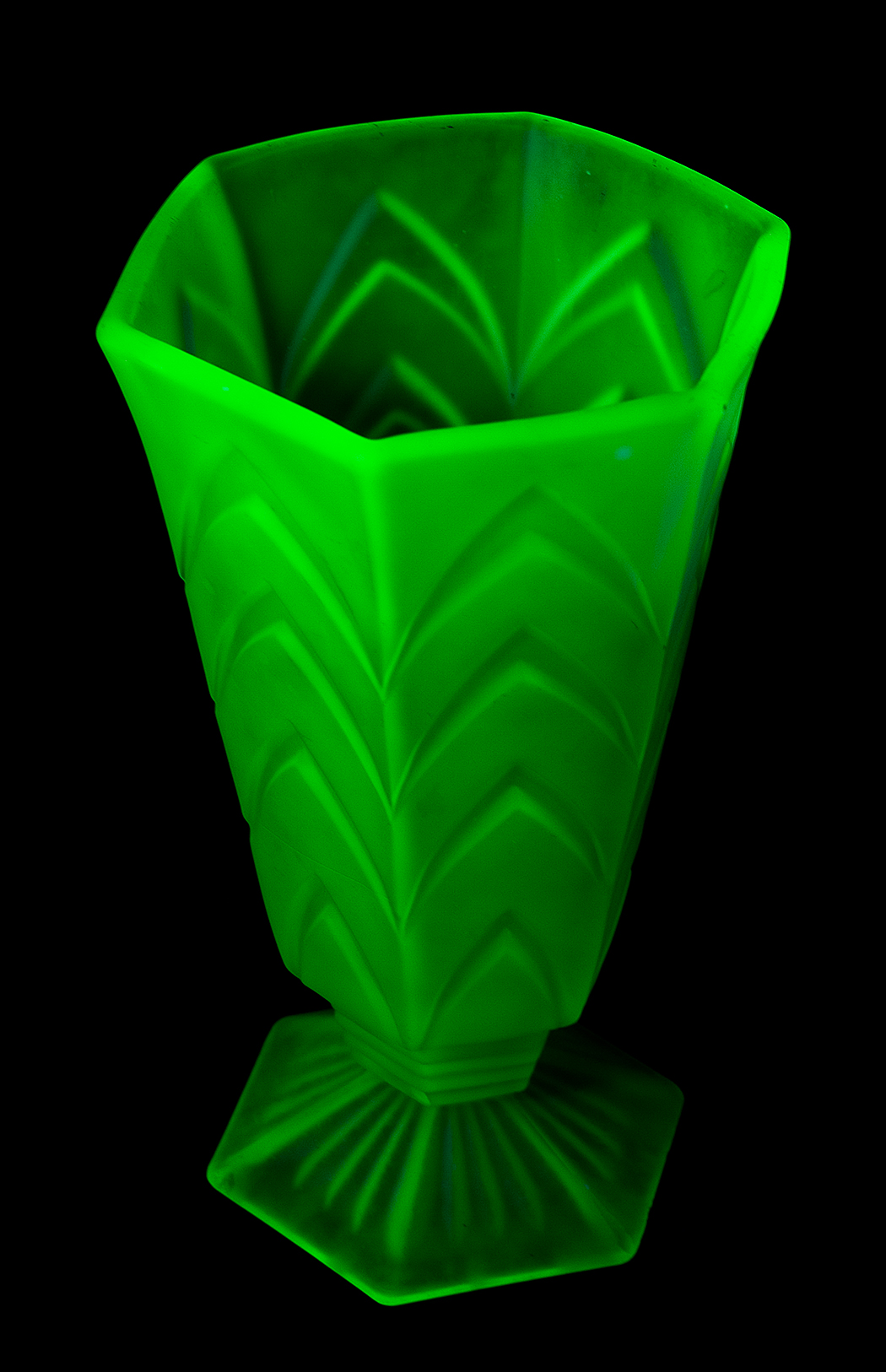
Fluorescent uranium Depression glass

== Elegant glass ==
A prominent sub-category of Depression Glass, Elegant glass, is of considerably better quality, often including polished mold seams, and hand-decoration such as cut patterns, etched patterns, and painted patterns. It was distributed through jewelry and department stores from the 1920s and continuing after the Great Depression through the 1950s, and was an alternative to fine china. Most of the Elegant glassware manufacturers had closed by the end of the 1950s, when cheap glassware and imported china replaced Elegant glass.

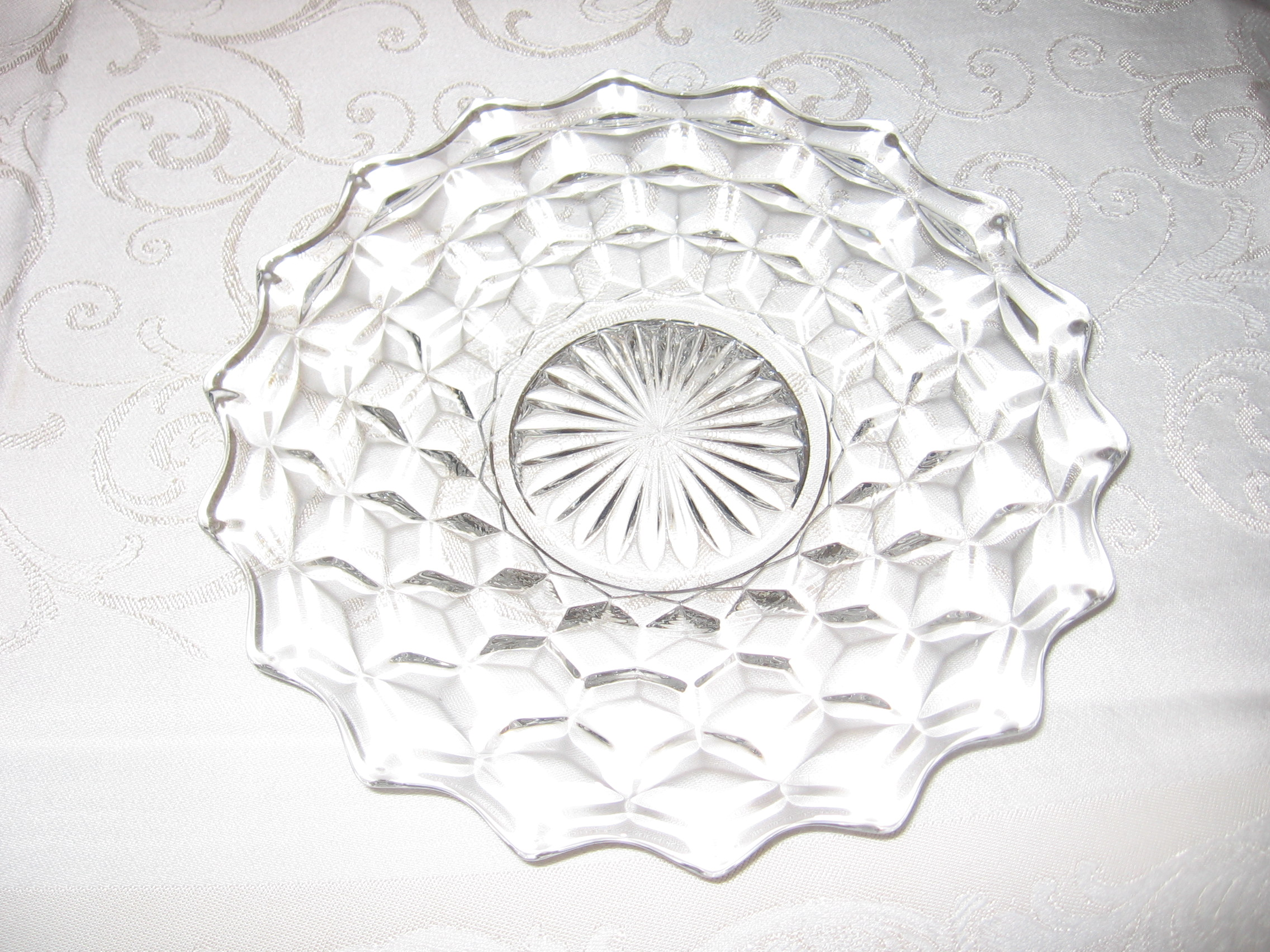
Fostoria plate

Some Elegant glass manufacturers were:

- Cambridge Glass Company
- Consolidated Lamp and Glass Company
- Duncan Miller Glass Company
- Fenton Art Glass Company
- Fostoria Glass Company
- Heisey Glass Company
- Imperial Glass Company
- Lotus Glass Company
- McKee Glass Company
- Morgantown Glass Works
- New Martinsville Glass Company
- Paden City Glass Company
- Tiffin Glass Company
- Westmoreland Glass Company

== See also ==
- Burmese glass
- Carnival glass
- Elegant glass
- Fiesta (dinnerware)
- Goofus glass
- Hazel-Atlas Glass Company
- Milk glass
- Pressed glass
- Satin glass
- Uranium glass
- Uranium tile
