= Monax =

Monax may refer to

- Marmota monax or groundhog
- Monax, a colour used in depression glass
