= Lancaster Glass Company =

Former glassware manufacturer in Ohio, US

The Lancaster Glass Company was a producer of manufactured glassware in Lancaster, Ohio that ran from 1908 to 1937. They are a producer of depression glass and were known as an early innovator of color in depression-era glassware.

== History ==
The company was founded by Lucien B. Martin and his son L. Phillip Martin in early July 1908. Following the creation of the company, a plant was built in Lancaster, Ohio, with plans to begin operations in November of that year. By the end of 1908, about 200 people were employed at the plant.

During the company's operating years, many patterns and colors were produced, and they were known mainly for their tableware and kitchen items. The glass made by Lancaster Glass Company can also be considered elegant glass, as it went through several finishing processes before being sold.

In 1924, the company was acquired by Anchor Hocking, who continued to produce glass under the Lancaster Glass Company name until 1937. After 1937, the Lancaster plant was known as Plant #2, which is still used today.

== Patterns and colors ==
Lancaster Glass Company had many popular patterns during its working years. Some of their lines were No. 906 Open Work, Jody, Marguerite, Morning Glory, and Sunshine. These patterns were more often found in decorative pieces rather than tableware. The company’s most popular tableware lines were No. 1200 Jubilee and No. 203 Patrick.

During the early years of the company, they produced mainly pressed single-color crystal glass, in shades such as rose, topaz, green, and turquoise, among others. However, once the 1920s came around the company moved into producing more color options, often with multiple colors in the form of designs and etchings.

The rarest pieces today are the Sphinx pattern, and almost any colored piece of Lancaster's Cable or Petal with the Corn Flower etching done by the W. J. Hughes Corn Flower Company.

Even after the official dissolution of the company in 1937, Lancaster Glass patterns continued to be released under the Anchor Hocking name.

== List of patterns ==
- Cable
- Cane Landrum
- Debbra
- Deco Brocade
- Jody
- Lana
- Marguerite
- Mermaid
- Morning Glory
- No. 1200 Jubilee
- No. 203 Patrick
- No. 906 Open Work
- Petal
- Sunshine
- Sphinx
