= Brockway Glass Company =

Defunct American glass company

- Formerly: Brockway Machine Bottle Company
- Industry: Glass
- Founded: 1907
- Defunct: 1988
- Fate: Merged with Owens-Illinois
- Successor: Owens-Brockway Glass Container Inc.
- Headquarters: Brockway, Pennsylvania, United States
- Products: Bottles and other glass containers

Brockway Glass Company was founded in 1907 in Brockway, Pennsylvania by the Brockway Machine Bottle Company (which later became Brockway Glass). Brockway manufactured and sold glass containers and tubing along with plastic products manufactured through wholly owned subsidiaries. In 1964, Brockway bought several Hazel-Atlas Glass Company factories from the Continental Can Company as part of a lawsuit settlement. In 1987, Owens-Illinois made a bid of $60 per share (worth $750 million) to acquire Brockway, which was met with resistance by the Federal Trade Commission (FTC). After a Federal District Judge denied the FTC's request for an injunction, Owens-Illinois acquired Brockway's shares.

In 2018, the former Brockway Glass plant in Washington County, Pennsylvania (closed since the late 1980s) was awarded a $1.5 million grant from Pennsylvania’s Redevelopment Assistance Capital Program.

== Owens-Brockway Glass Container Inc. ==
The wholly owned subsidiary, Owens-Brockway Glass Containers Inc., was the result of the 1988 merger between Brockway and Owens-Illinois. Owens-Brockway Glass Container owns all of Owens-Illinois worldwide glass operations.
