= Pairpoint Glass =

American glass manufacturer

Pairpoint Glass Company (Pairpoint Manufacturing Company)
- Type: Private
- Industry: Glass; Manufacturing
- Founded: 1837
- Founder: Deming Jarves (Mount Washington Glass Co.); Thomas J. Pairpoint (Pairpoint Manufacturing Co.)
- Headquarters: Sagamore, MA
- Key people: Jeffrey Tulman (co-owner); Gary Tulman (co-owner)
- Website: pairpoint.com

Pairpoint Glass Company is an American glass manufacturer based in Sagamore, Massachusetts. It is the oldest operating glass company in the United States.

== History ==
The company was founded by Deming Jarves in 1837 in South Boston, Massachusetts, as the Mount Washington Glass Works. Jarves had previously founded the New England Glass Company in 1818. Mount Washington did not at first have an official name, and until around 1850 was informally known as Russell's Glass House, after Luther Russell, the glasshouse superintendent. The first known use of the Mount Washington name was in the 1857 publication History of South Boston. In 1870, Mount Washington relocated to New Bedford, Massachusetts. That year, the company was briefly renamed W. L. Libbey & Company, before being incorporated as the Mount Washington Glass Works the following year. In 1876, the name was changed slightly, to the Mount Washington Glass Company.

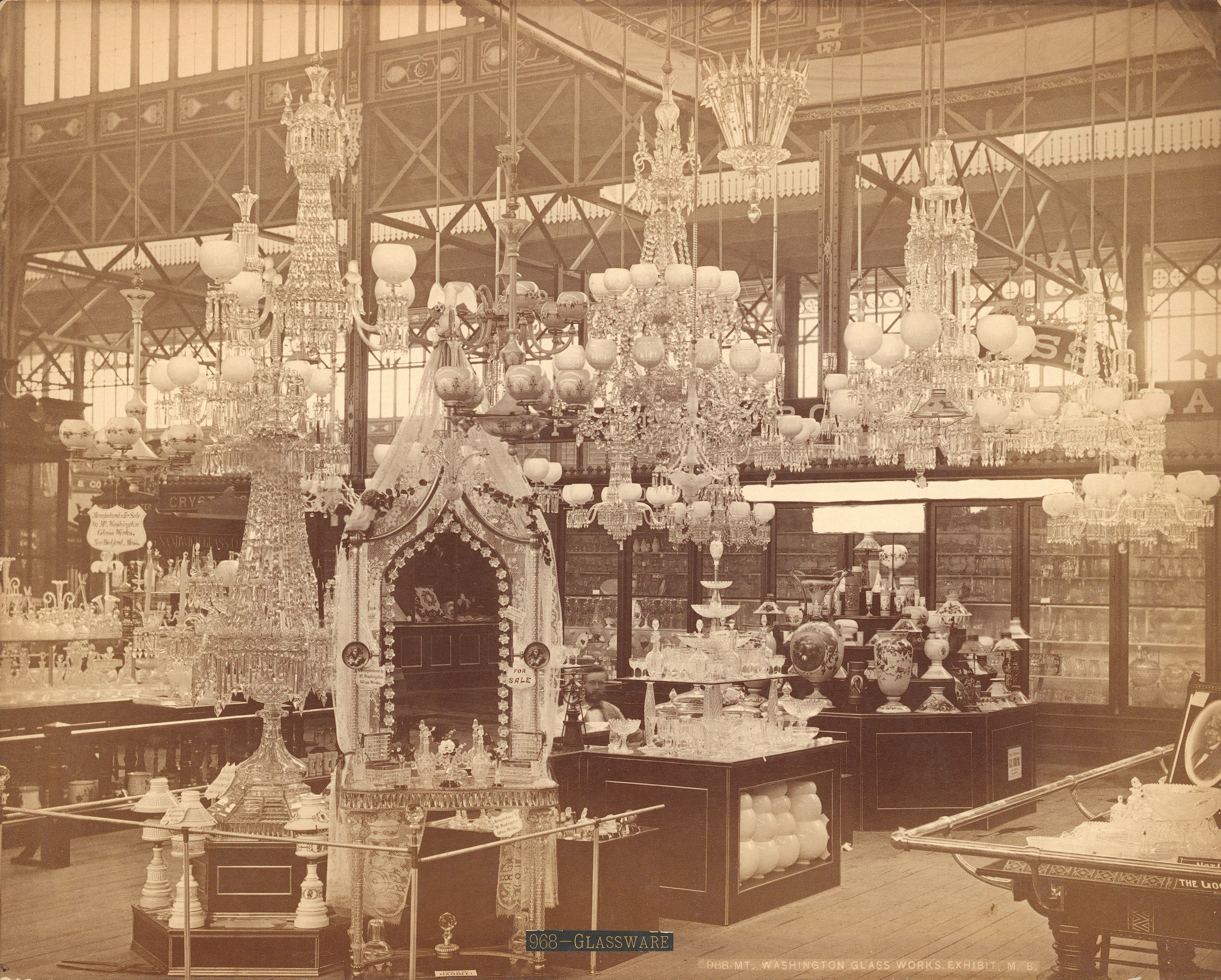
The Mount Washington Glass Works exhibit at the U.S. Centennial Exhibition in Philadelphia, 1876

From 1876 through 1881, the company produced an extensive line of lighting goods and other glassware, including glass chimneys, fine blown cut glass and pressed glassware. In the 1880s, the company primarily produced art glass. In 1885, it introduced Burmese art glass, a translucent, heat reactive glass that shades from yellow at the bottom to pink at the top. The company became known for this type of glass, obtaining a British patent for it in 1886, and presenting a number of Burmese pieces to Queen Victoria.

In 1880, British silver designer Thomas Pairpoint (1838-1902) resigned his position as head designer at the Meriden Brittania Company and founded the Pairpoint Manufacturing Company, which was established in New Bedford as a silver manufacturer supplying Mount Washington with silver-plated metal mounts for its glass lamps and other products. In 1894, the two companies merged and in 1900 were renamed the Pairpoint Corporation.

In 1939, the company was reorganized as Gundersen Glass Works, named after master glassblower and new owner Robert Gundersen. After Gundersen's death in 1952, the company became the Gundersen-Pairpoint Glass Works until 1957, when it was renamed a final time to Pairpoint Glass Company. Now under the guidance of Robert Bryden, it ceased operations at its New Bedford plant and relocated briefly to East Wareham, Massachusetts. The company moved overseas in 1958 to leased facilities in Spain, exporting limited quantities of stemware, perfume bottles and paperweights back to the US. Pairpoint returned to the US in 1967, and in 1970 opened a newly built factory in Sagamore, Massachusetts, near the Cape Cod Canal.

The invention of the light bulb and the corresponding rise of the use of electricity was central to the company's success in the late 19th century. In the early 20th century through the early 1930s, its distinctive glass lampshades gained international popularity. In the second half of the 20th century, Pairpoint went on a decline, when it started producing a less expensive, lower quality product in an attempt to expand its customer base and combat foreign competition. In 2015, Jeffrey Tulman and his brother Gary Tulman acquired Pairpoint and returned the company to its classic high-end designs, reintroducing the revitalized product to collectors and luxury glass buyers.

== Products ==
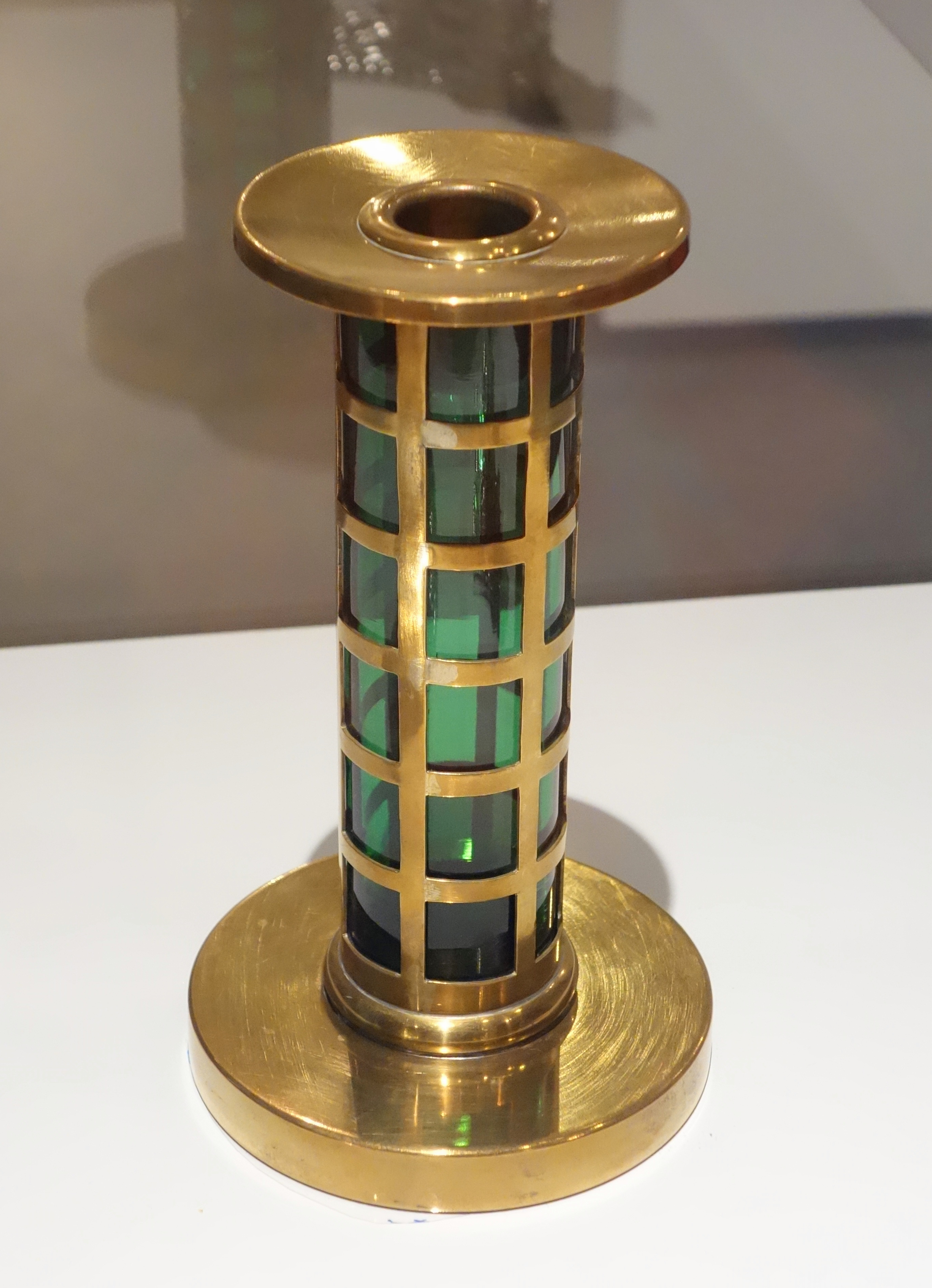
Pairpoint candlestick, 1912 Brooklyn Museum

Pairpoint is known for three kinds of glass lampshades, originally produced from the mid-1890s through the mid-1920s: reverse painted landscape shades (where the glass is hand painted on the inside surface so colors appear softly through the glass), blown out reverse painted shades, and ribbed reverse painted shades, mostly with floral designs and landscape scenes. In 1910, the company began using a spherical knop (or "bubble ball") on some of its pieces, a technique involving trapping air bubbles inside a piece of glass in a symmetrical pattern, which can be applied to ice buckets, decanters, glassware, and other pierces. This became a trademark of the company.

Pairpoint's reverse painted lamps are generally considered to be the most popular and expensive of such lamps on the antique market. Rare Pairpoint lamps have been sold for six figures (USD), while more commonly available lamps have sold in the high four figures.

The company produces a range of glass pieces, including custom pendants, sconces, chandeliers and accent lighting. Pairpoint also produces barware, candlesticks, bookends, bowls and vases, as well as a line of controlled bubble ball door knobs. Pairpoint products are handmade in the US.

== Museum collections and exhibitions ==
More than 50 Pairpoint silver pieces from 1880 to 1929 are a part of the permanent collection of the Brooklyn Museum. These include pitchers, goblets and candlesticks. Early Pairpoint pieces are also a part of the permanent collections of the Metropolitan Museum of Art in New York City, including silver candlesticks from 1905, a rose glass bowl from 1898, and a glass vase ca. 1886-94; the Museum of Fine Arts in Boston; and the New Bedford Museum of Glass. A 2011 exhibition at the Corning Museum of Glass in Corning, New York, was titled Mt. Washington and Pairpoint: American Glass From the Gilded Age to the Roaring Twenties. It told the story of the company and featured over 150 pieces from the 1880s to the 1930s, including art glass, cut glass, kerosene and electric lamps, and decorative tableware.

Kenneth Morley Wilson, a renowned historian of glass manufacture in America, compiled a history of the company in Mt. Washington and Pairpoint Glass, in two volumes published in 2005 and 2011 by the Antique Collectors' Club of Woodbridge, England.

== Milestones ==
Year	Event
1837	Mount Washington Glass Works founded by Deming Jarves in South Boston, MA.
1870	Mount Washington relocates to New Bedford, MA.
1880	Pairpoint Manufacturing Company founded by Thomas J. Pairpoint.
1894	Mount Washington Glass Works merges with Pairpoint Manufacturing.
1900	Renamed The Pairpoint Corporation.
1939	Renamed Gunderson Glass Works.
1952	Renamed Gunderson-Pairpoint Glass Works.
1957	Renamed Pairpoint Glass Company.
1970	Pairpoint Glass moves to Sagamore, MA, under the continued ownership of Robert Brydon.
2004	Thomas Fiocco acquires Pairpoint Glass, CEO until his death in 2014.
2015	Jeffrey Tulman and Gary Tulman acquire Pairpoint, under Pairpoint Manufacturing Company.

== See also ==
- Leonard E. Padgett, Pairpoint Glass (South Capitol Press, 1968)
- George C. Avila, The Pairpoint Glass Story (self-published, 1968)
- Louis O. St. Aubin, Jr., Pairpoint Lamps: A Collectors Guide (Brookside Antiques, 1974)
- Marion and Sandra Frost, The Essence of Pairpoint: Fine Glassware 1918-1938 (Schiffer Publishing, 2001)
- Martin M. May, Great Art Glass Lamps: Tiffany, Duffner & Kimberly, Pairpoint, and Handel (Schiffer Publishing, 2003)
- Kenneth M. Wilson, Mt. Washington & Pairpoint Glass (Antique Collectors Club, 2005)
- Marion and Sandra Frost, The Comprehensive Guide to Pairpoint Glass: Shapes and Patterns (Schiffer Publishing, 2006)
- Edward and Sheila Malakoff, Pairpoint Lamps (Schiffer Publishing, 2007)
- Kenneth M. Wilson and Jane Shadel Spillman, Mt. Washington & Pairpoint Glass: Volume Two (Antique Collectors Club, 2011)
