= Fairy lamp =

Small, glass candle lamp

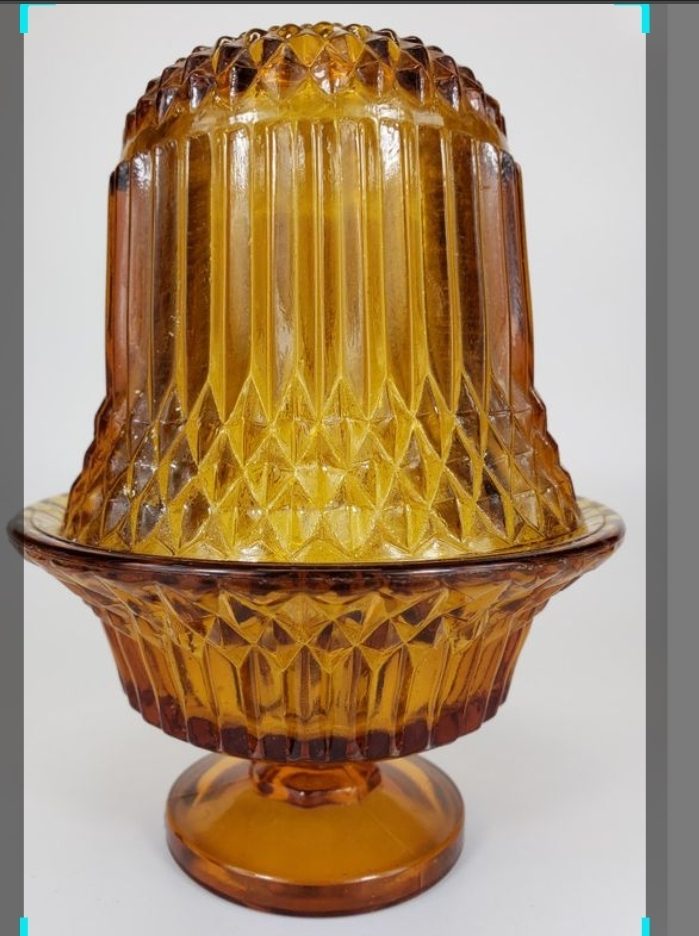
A fairy lamp

Fairy lamps (depending on locale, also called fairy lights) were a small, glass candle lamp that originally gained popularity during the 1880s and '90's.

== History ==
The lamps' original purpose was utilitarian with the typical pieces including the base, a cup for the candle, and the chimney or shade. Their creation began in the 1840s, when a new type of candle was developed. These candles were smaller, fatter, and encased with paper; they were usually set in a saucer of water to burn. They burned longer and carried less risk of fire, a common danger of the Victorian era.

Samuel Clarke, one of several English designers of lighting devices, patented a glass cup covered with a dome on December 14, 1885. His company promoted the lamps as a way to sell their own candles. Clarke's original lamps feature a fairy embossed into the bottom, and they became so popular that all small candle-based lamps became known as "fairy lamps." They became extremely popular, due to the sudden affordability of mass-produced glass and candles, and were frequently used to illuminate nurseries, sickrooms, and hallways. Samuel Clarke even designed a fairy lamp in the shape of a crown in honor of Queen Victoria's Golden Jubilee. The Queen reportedly purchased 1,500 of these lamps "for her own use". The popularity of fairy lamps spread to America, and glassworks on the eastern seaboard and Midwest began manufacturing fairy lamps as well. An exhibit at the 1893 World's Fair in Chicago featuring an island lit by fairy lamps (3,000 of which were donated by Samuel Clarke), later toured various American cities. Fairy lamps themselves continued to be used through the 1920s.

The Fenton Art Glass Company resumed production of the fairy lamp in the early 1950s, and the items continue to remain collectible.
