= United States v. Continental Can Co. =

- Supreme Court of the United States

Argued April 28, 1964 Decided June 22, 1964
- Full case name: United States v. Continental Can Co., et al.
- Citations: 378 U.S. 441 (more) 84 S. Ct. 1738; 12 L. Ed. 2d 953; 1964 U.S. LEXIS 2224; 1964 Trade Cas. (CCH) ¶ 71,146

Case history
- Prior: Motion to dismiss granted, 217 F. Supp. 761 (S.D.N.Y. 1963)

Holding
- Section 7 of the Clayton Act, which prohibits a corporation from acquiring another company when it results in a substantial reduction in competition, applies to competition between different industries for the same end user market. Southern District of New York reversed and remanded.

Court membership
- Chief Justice Earl Warren Associate Justices Hugo Black · William O. Douglas; Tom C. Clark · John M. Harlan II; William J. Brennan Jr. · Potter Stewart; Byron White · Arthur Goldberg

Case opinions
- Majority: White, joined by Warren, Black, Douglas, Clark, Brennan, Goldberg
- Concurrence: Goldberg
- Dissent: Harlan, joined by Stewart

Laws applied
- 15 U.S.C. § 18 (Clayton Act § 7)

United States v. Continental Can Co., 378 U.S. 441 (1964), was a U.S. Supreme Court case which addressed antitrust issues. One issue it addressed was how should a market segment be defined for purposes of reviewing a merger of companies which manufacture different but related products.

== Facts ==
In 1956, Continental Can Company, the second largest producer of metal containers in the U.S., acquired the Hazel-Atlas Glass Company, the third largest producer of glass containers.

The government sought Continental Can's divestiture of the assets of Hazel-Atlas, arguing that the merger was a violation of Section 7 of the Clayton Antitrust Act. The government claimed ten product markets existed, including the can industry, the glass container industry, and various lines of commerce defined by the end use of the containers.

== Judgment ==
The United States District Court for the Southern District of New York found three product markets: metal containers, glass containers, and beer containers. The district court dismissed the case, holding that the government had failed to prove reasonable probability of lessening competition in the markets it had identified.

=== Supreme Court ===
The Supereme Court ruled that a relevant product market or "line of commerce" does not necessarily mean identical products. Because metal and glass containers competed directly to be used for beverages and baby food, they occupied the same market space, and therefore the acquisition was a threat to free competition.

== See also ==
- US antitrust law
- List of United States Supreme Court cases, volume 378
