= Silgan Holdings =

American manufacturer

Silgan Holdings Inc.
- Trade name: Silgan Holdings
- Type: Public
- Traded as: Nasdaq: SLGN; S&P 400 Component
- Industry: Packaging manufacturing
- Founded: 1987; 39 years ago
- Founder: Phil Silver and Greg Horrigan
- Headquarters: Stamford, Connecticut
- Revenue: $6.2 billion US Dollars
- Number of employees: 12,515 (2017)
- Website: silganholdings.com

Silgan Holdings Inc. is an American manufacturing company based in Connecticut that produces consumer goods packaging. The company was founded in 1987 by two former executives of Continental Can, Phil Silver and Greg Horrigan – their names contributing to the company name.

Silgan Holdings employs around 17,000 staff within its own and its subsidiary companies. It is currently headquartered in Stamford, Connecticut, and has factories across North America and Europe.

== History ==
After being founded in 1987, Silver and Horrigan proceeded to acquire several competitors and pursued contracts with Del Monte and Nestle. Their share of the market rose from 10% in 1987 to 36% in 1995, according to the New York Times. The company purchased a portion of a rival organisation, the Campbell Soup Company, in 1998 for $150 million US Dollars. These acquisitions, however, did saddle the company with significant debt in the late 1990s – it owed $700 million in "long term debt" in September 1997. In 2003, one hundred employees went on strike over wages and health benefits, following a failure of negotiations.

By the late 2000s, however, Silgan was consistently profitable. Between 2004 and 2005 profits rose by 3.1%, as did its position on the Fortune 500 list. In 2009 it registered $131.6 million in profits, a 7.2% increase over 2007, and was ranked at 671, an increase of fifteen levels. In 2011 Silgan attempted to purchase the entirety of Graham Packaging for $1.3 billion but was ultimately outbid by Reynolds Group Holdings paying $1.68 billion.

In 2013, Silgan's share-holdings had risen by 15% over the previous two years, though despite several successful acquisitions including Rexam’s Plastic Thermoformed Food Business for 248.1 million, dropping demand in Europe was still problematic. By July 2013, shares had fallen by 0.9%. Upon completing the acquisition of Portola Packaging in October 2013, however, share prices then stabilized and went on to increase by a further 5.1%.

The company has not escaped controversy during the 2010s, however. In 2009 a lawsuit was filed against the organization by the US Equal Employment Opportunity Commission after viewing that the company "denied promotion to and refused reasonable accommodation for an employee who is missing three fingers on his left hand." A $45,000 settlement was also paid out to an African American employee in 2010 who, the Equal Employment Opportunity Commission ruled, was terminated under racial grounds and also subjected "to disparate and discriminatory treatment such as holding him to a higher standard on his work than non-black employees." This followed more strikes by staff over pay and working conditions in May 2010.

Silgan Holdings acquired the food can business of Vogel & Noot Holding, headquartered in Vienna; the transaction was completed in March 2011. VN operated in 2010 12 food can manufacturing facilities throughout Central and Eastern Europe, anticipating €250 million sales for 2010. In Jan 2017, Silgan entered into an agreement to acquire WestRock’s home, health and beauty business for $1.025 billion.
