= Hazel-Atlas Glass Company =

Former American glassware manufacturer

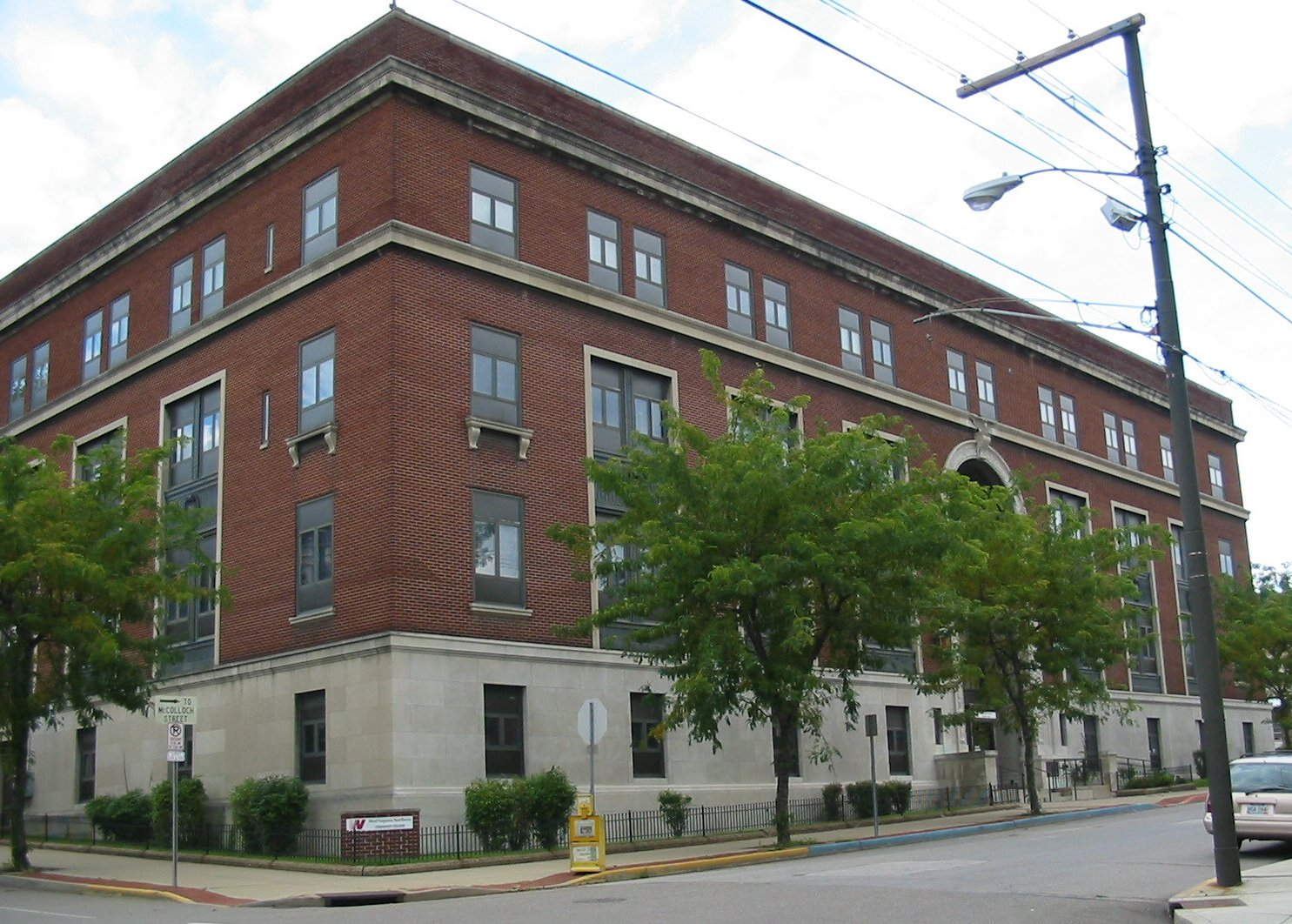
Hazel-Atlas Glass Company

The Hazel-Atlas Glass Company was a large producer of machine-molded glass containers headquartered in Wheeling, West Virginia. It was founded in 1902 in Washington, Pennsylvania, as the merger of four companies:

- Hazel Glass and Metals Company (started in 1887)
- Atlas Glass Company (started 1896)
- Wheeling Metal Plant
- Republic Glass Company

== History ==
By the 1900s, Hazel-Atlas was a large glass maker, with 15 plants, including ones in Ada, Oklahoma; Clarksburg, West Virginia; Montgomery, Alabama; Oakland, California; Pomona, California and Zanesville, Ohio. Hazel-Atlas made large quantities of "Depression" pressed glassware in a wide variety of patterns in the 1920s–1940s, along with many white milkglass "inserts" used in zinc fruit-jar lids, many types of milkglass cold-cream jars and salve containers, and a large variety of bottles and jars for the commercial packaging industry. "Atlas" was the brand of the company's most popular line of fruit jars for home canning.

Hazel-Atlas—then the third largest producer of glass containers in the United States, with almost ten percent of the market—became a subsidiary of the Continental Can Company in 1957. The acquisition was challenged under the Clayton Antitrust Act in a case that was eventually decided by the U.S. Supreme Court in United States v. Continental Can Co.. It continued to make containers, glassware, and tableware into the 1960s. In 1964, 10 of the 12 H-A plants in operation were sold to Brockway Glass Company, and it is unclear whether the remaining two plants used the H-A trademark after that year.

== Patterns ==
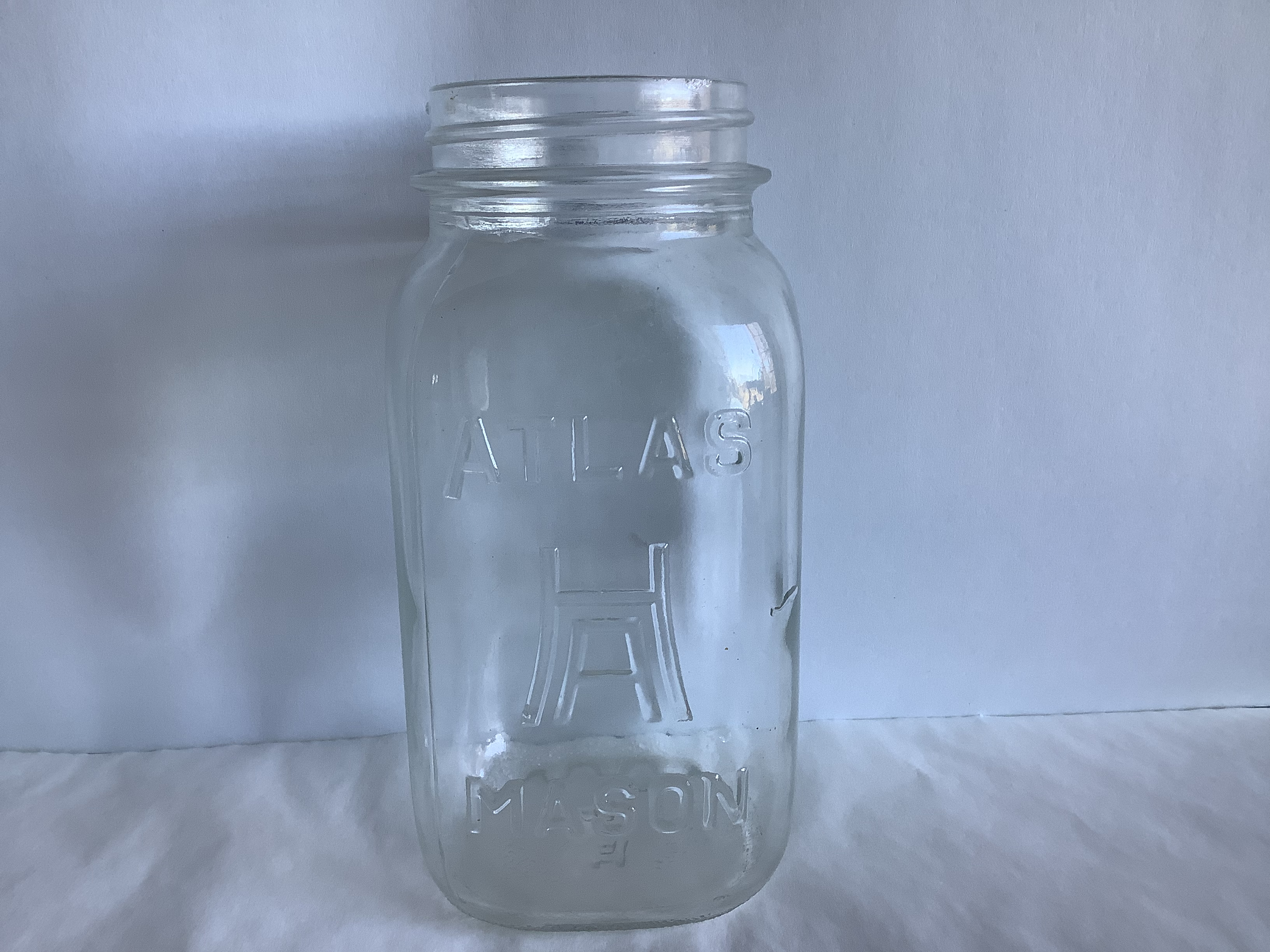

Hazel-Atlas produced dozens of different patterns, with unique names. The Hazel-Atlas mark, usually placed on the back of the product, is an "A" nestled underneath an "H". The mark was reportedly first used in 1923, according to trademark office records quoted by Peterson (400 Trademarks on Glass).

== External links and references ==
- Hazel-Atlas Depression glass a field unto itself, from a February 2005 article in The San Diego Union-Tribune
- Hazel Atlas Glass Collecting Website
- Summary of the Hazel-Atlas Glass Company, with discussion on types of glass made (webpage on the GlassBottleMarks.com site)
