= Satin glass =

Satin glass is glass that has been chemically treated to give it a misty-looking finish. The term "satin glass" is frequently used to refer to a collectible type of pressed glass.

Satin glass can be used for decorative items. However, satin glass is also used to provide privacy where the full transparency of glass is undesirable.

The satin finish is produced by treating the glass with hydrofluoric acid or hydrofluoric acid fumes.

Satin glass was first made as decorative pressed glass in England and the United States during the 1880s. Many companies have produced this type of satin glass.

It is similar to milk glass in that it is opaque, and has decorative surface patterns molded into it, however, satin glass has a satin, rather than glossy surface. Satin glass is typically tinted with a pastel color, blue is the most common.

It was produced by the Fenton Art Glass Company between 1972 and 1984 in large quantities.

Satin glass, like milk glass and carnival glass, is considered a collectible. Due to recent high production volume, prices commanded by satin glass are relatively low. However, certain large pieces produced in low volume can command high prices, especially if in perfect condition.

Burnishing a piece of satin glass will polish the satin finish away, leaving a glossy spot and greatly reducing the value as a collectable. Even friction from repeated ordinary handling, such as dusting with a cloth, will eventually add glossy spots to the finish, so the most desirable pieces become more rare even without breakage and chipping.

== See also ==
- Glass etching
