= Burmese glass =

Opaque colored art glass

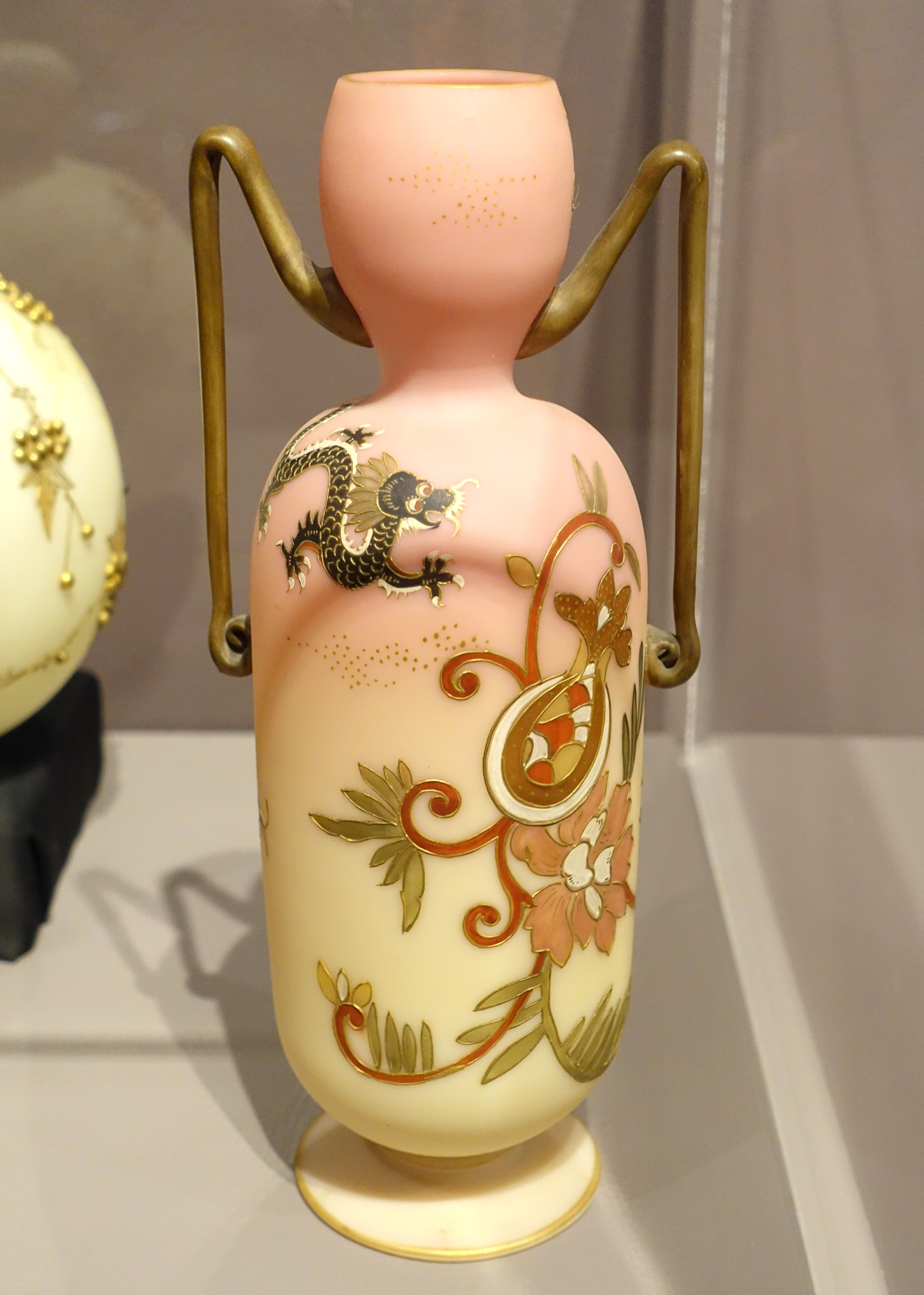
Burmese handled vase by the Mount Washington Glass Company, c. 1890

Burmese glass is a type of opaque colored art glass, shading from yellow, blue or green to pink. It is found in either the rare original "shiny" finish or the more common "satin" finish. It is used for table glass and small, ornamental vases and dressing table articles.

It was made in 1885 by the Mount Washington Glass Company of New Bedford, Massachusetts, USA. Burmese glass found favor with Queen Victoria. From 1886, the British company of Thomas Webb & Sons was licensed to produce the glass. Their version, known as Queen's Burmeseware, which was used for tableware and decorative glass, often with painted decoration. Burmese was also made after 1970 by the Fenton art glass company.

Burmese was originally a uranium glass. The original formula to produce Burmese Glass contained uranium oxide with tincture of gold added.The uranium oxide produced the inherent soft yellow color of Burmese glass. Because of the added gold, the characteristic pink blush of color of Burmese was fashioned by re-heating the object in the furnace (the "Glory Hole"). The length of time in the furnace will determine the intensity of the color. Strangely, if the object is subjected to the heat again, it will return to the original yellow color.

In the 1980s, Fenton Glass Company began producing a product it called “Blue Burmese”, based on a formula developed in 1886 by chemist Frederick Shirley of the Mt. Washington Glass Company. Shirley's formula substituted cobalt and/or copper oxide for uranium oxide, producing pale blue glasses rather than the original pale yellow. Mt Washington Glass Company had referred to its similarly coloured glasses, made of ruby glass with added cobalt, as "Peachblow" or "Peach Skin"; it was not commercially successful.
