= Uranium glass =

Glass colored with uranium oxide

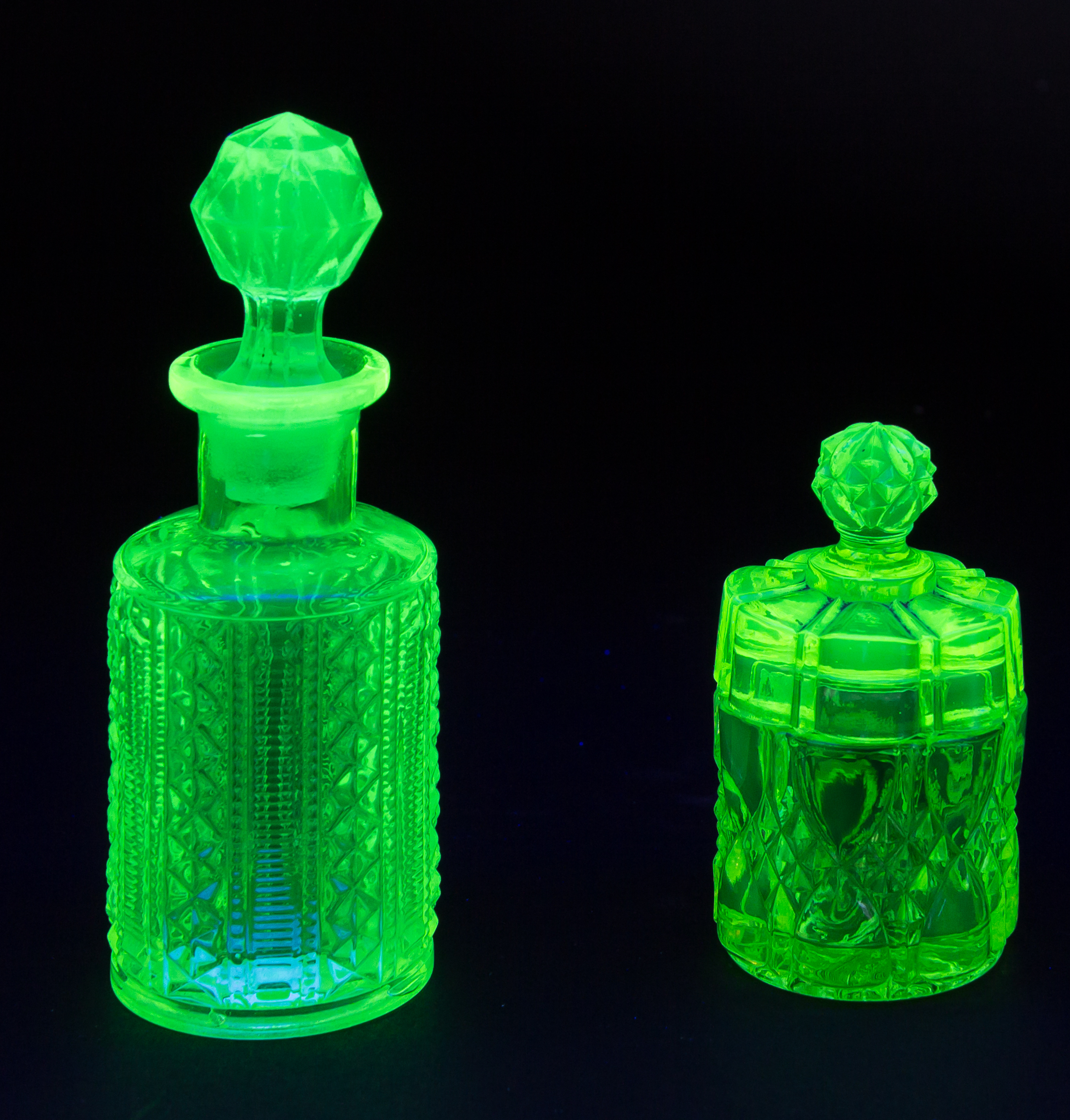
Uranium glassware glowing under ultraviolet light

Uranium glass or vaseline glass or canary glass is glass which has had uranium, usually in oxide diuranate form, added to a glass mix before melting for coloration. The proportion usually varies from trace levels to about 2% uranium by weight, although some 20th-century pieces were made with up to 25% uranium.

First identified in 1789 by German chemist Martin Heinrich Klaproth, uranium was soon being added to decorative glass for its fluorescent effect. James Powell's Whitefriars Glass company in London, England, was one of the first to market the glowing glass, but other manufacturers soon realized its sales potential and uranium glass was produced across Europe and later the United States.

Uranium glass was made into tableware and household items, but fell out of widespread use when the availability of uranium to most industries was sharply curtailed during the Cold War in the 1940s to 1990s, with the vast majority of the world's uranium supply being utilized as a strategic material for use in nuclear weapons or nuclear power. Most uranium glass is now considered to be antiques or retro-era collectables, although there has been a minor revival in glass art. Otherwise, modern uranium glass is now mainly limited to small objects like beads or marbles as scientific or decorative novelties.

== Appearance ==
The normal color of uranium glass ranges from yellow to green depending on the oxidation state and concentration of the metal ions, although this may be altered by the addition of other elements as glass colorants. Uranium glass also fluoresces bright green under ultraviolet light.

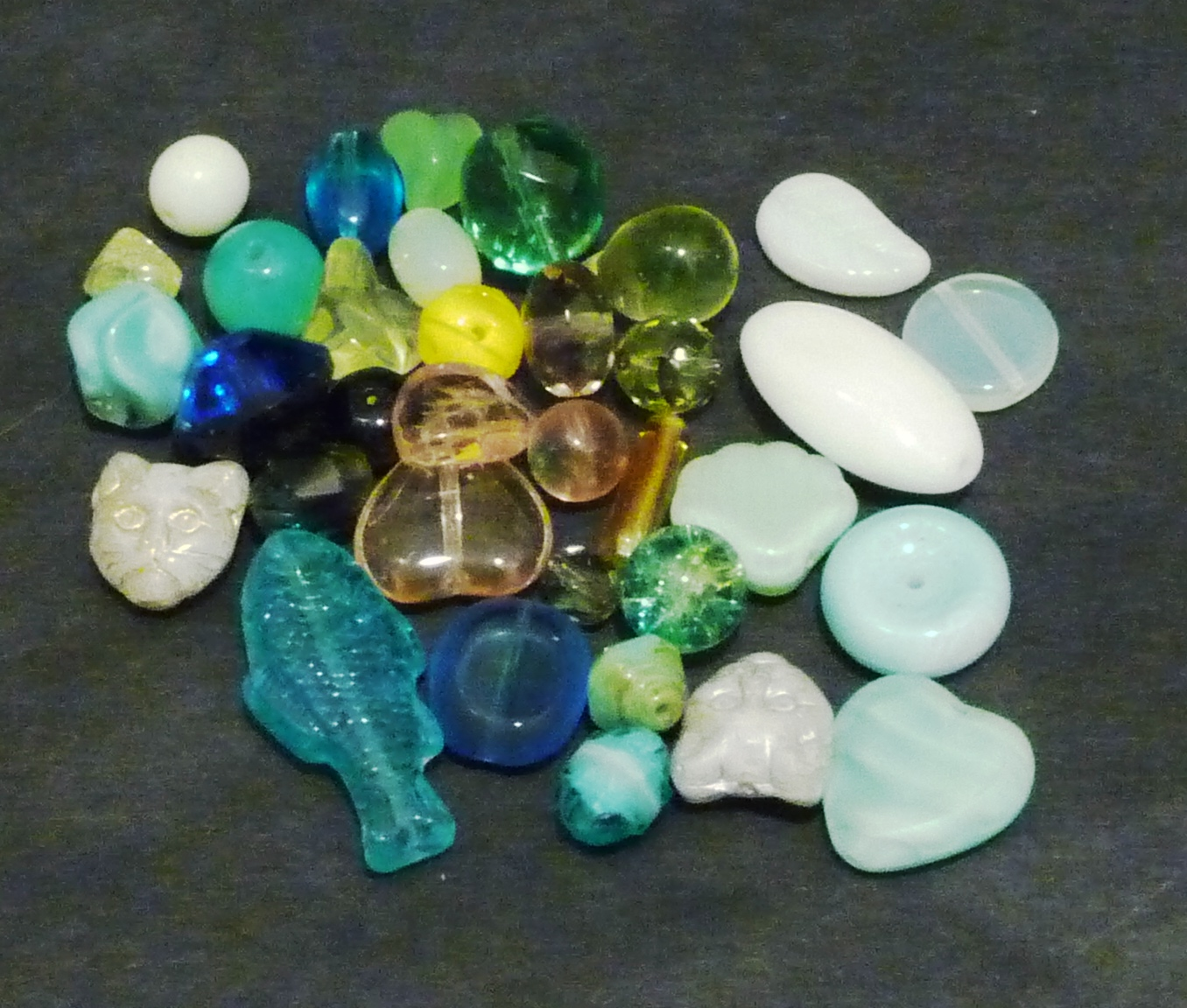
Modern uranium glass beads

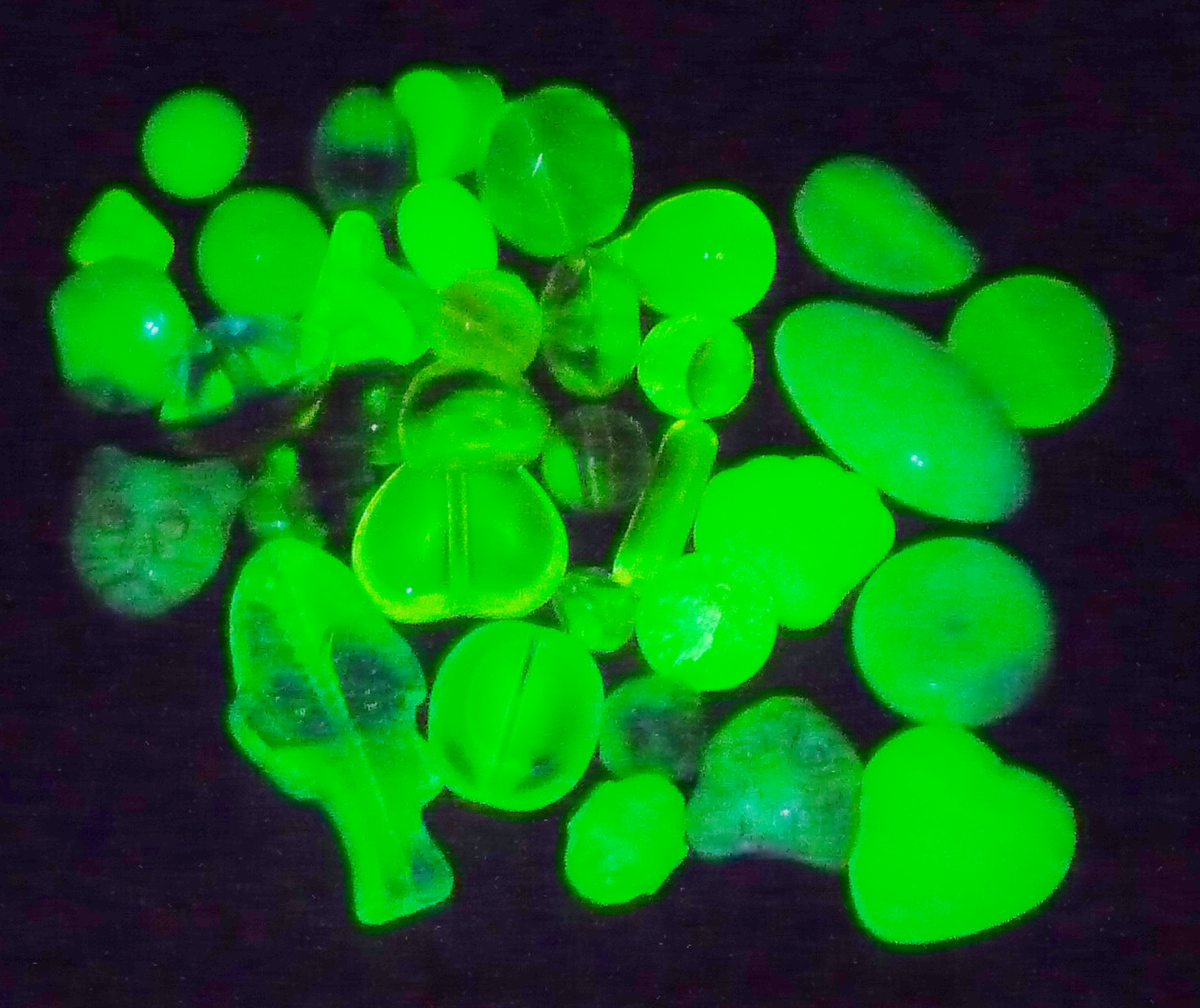
The same items under UV light

=== Vaseline glass ===
The most common color of uranium glass is pale yellowish-green, which in the 1930s led to the nickname "Vaseline glass", based on a perceived resemblance to the appearance of Vaseline-brand petroleum jelly as formulated at that time. Specialized collectors still define Vaseline glass as transparent or semi-transparent uranium glass in this specific color.

Vaseline glass is sometimes used as a synonym for any uranium glass, especially in the United States, but this usage is frowned upon, since Vaseline-brand petroleum jelly was only yellow, not other colors. The term is sometimes applied to other types of glass based on certain aspects of their superficial appearance in normal light, regardless of actual uranium content which requires a blacklight test to verify the characteristic green fluorescence.

In the United Kingdom and Australia, the term Vaseline glass can be used to refer to any type of translucent glass.

=== Other colors ===
Several other common subtypes of uranium glass have their own nicknames:

- Custard glass (opaque or semiopaque pale yellow)
- Jadite glass (opaque or semi-opaque pale green; initially, the name was trademarked as "Jadite", although this is sometimes over-corrected in modern usage to "jadeite")
- Depression glass (transparent or semitransparent pale green).
- Burmese glass (opaque glass that shades from pink to yellow)

Like "Vaseline", the terms "custard" and "jad(e)ite" are often applied on the basis of superficial appearance rather than uranium content. Conversely, "Depression glass" is a general description for any piece of glassware manufactured during the Great Depression regardless of appearance or formula.

== Usage ==
=== Ancient usage ===
The use of uranium glass dates back to at least 79 AD, the date of a mosaic containing yellow glass with 1% uranium oxide, which was found in a Roman villa on Cape Posillipo in the Bay of Naples, Italy, in 1912.

=== Medieval usage ===
Starting in the late Middle Ages, pitchblende was extracted from the Habsburg silver mines in Joachimsthal, Bohemia (now Jáchymov in the Czech Republic), and was used as a coloring agent in the local glassmaking industry.

=== Modern usage ===
In 1789, Martin Klaproth discovered uranium. He later experimented with the use of the element as a glass colorant.

Uranium glass became popular in the late-19th and early-20th centuries, with its period of greatest popularity being from the 1880s to the 1920s.

The first major producer of items made of uranium glass is commonly recognized as Austrian Franz Xaver Riedel, who named the yellow (German: Gelb) and yellow-green (German: Gelb-Grün) varieties of the glass annagelb and annagrün, respectively, in honor of his daughter Anna Maria. Riedel was a prolific blower of uranium glass in Unter-Polaun (today Dolni Polubny), Bohemia from 1830 to 1848.

By the 1840s, many other European glassworks began to produce uranium glass items and developed new varieties of uranium glass. The Baccarat glassworks in France created an opaque green uranium glass which they named chrysoprase from its similarity to the green form of chalcedony of the same name.

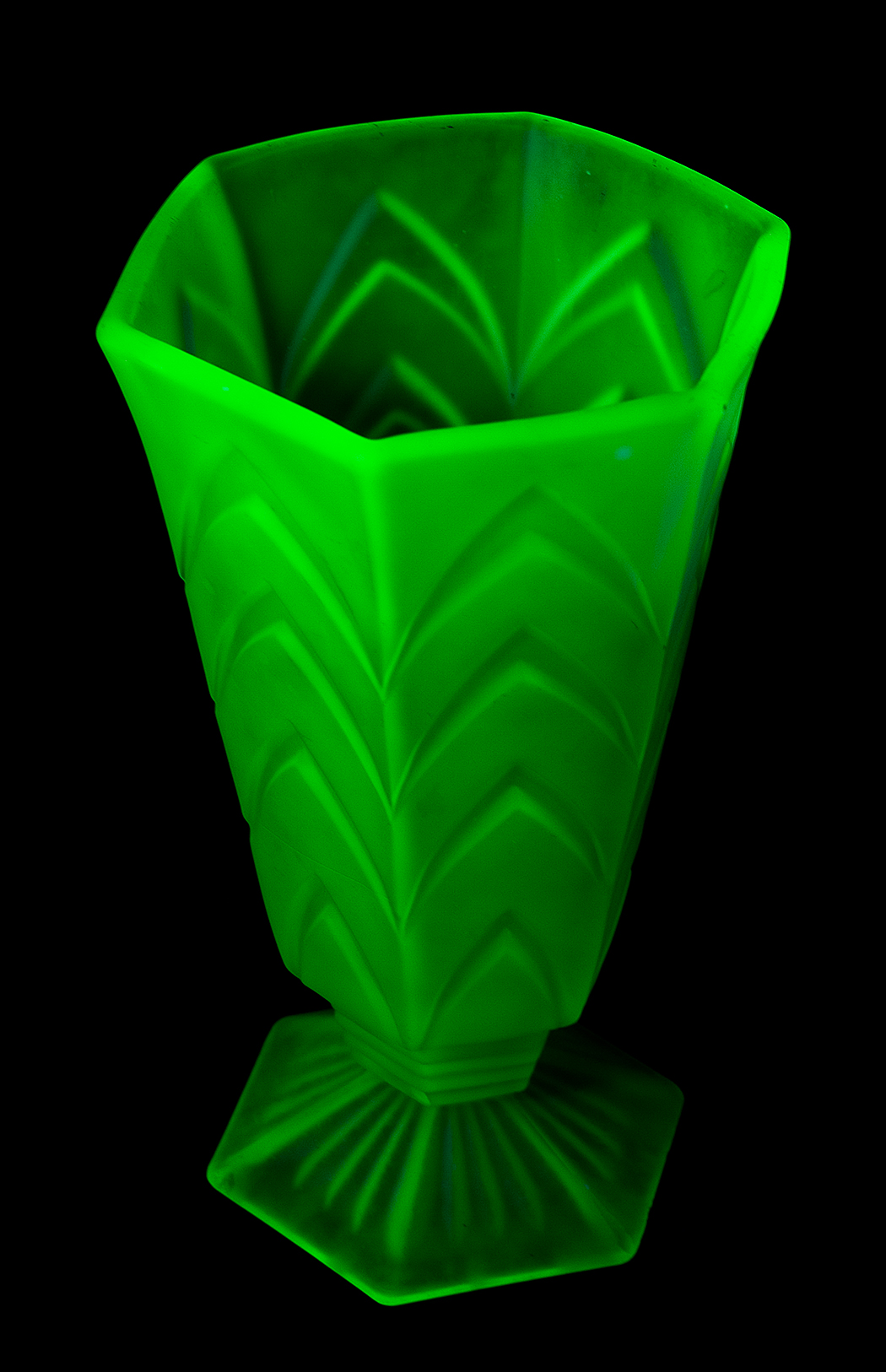
Fluorescent uranium Depression glass

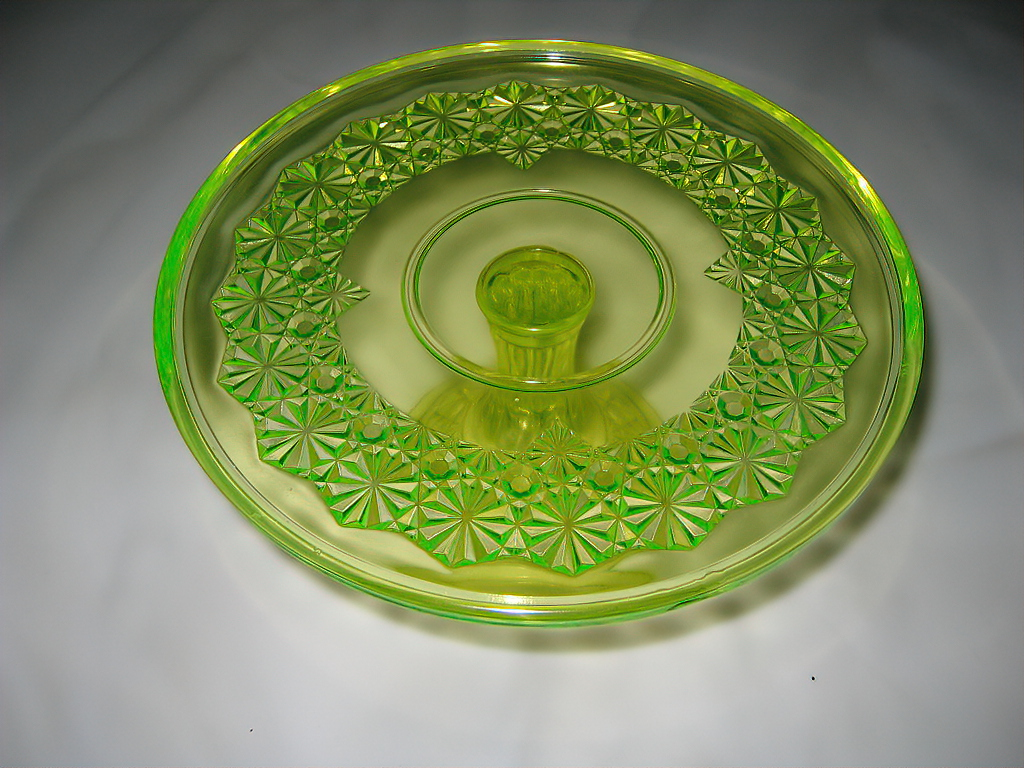
A uranium glass cakeplate

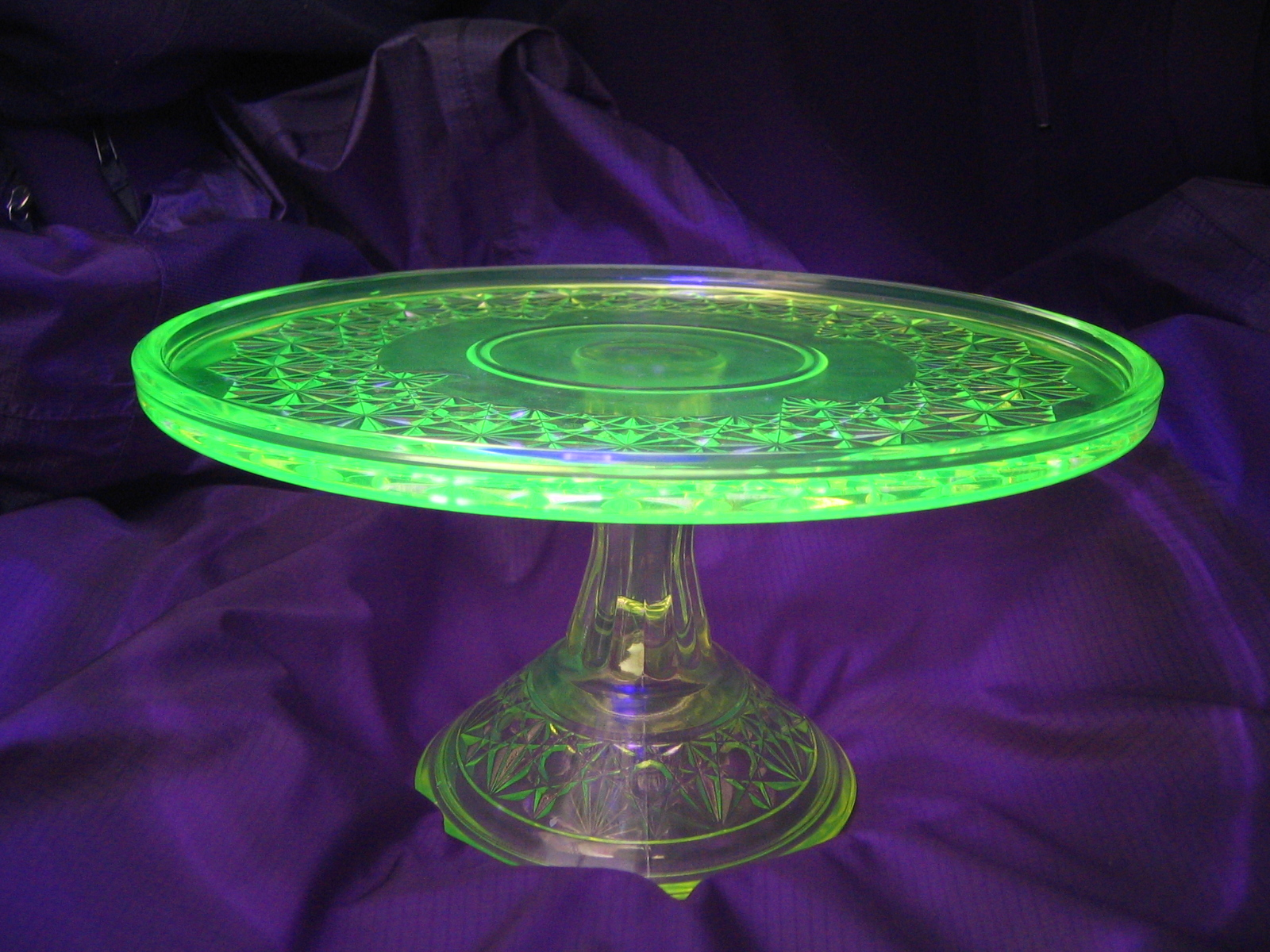
Uranium glass glowing under UV light

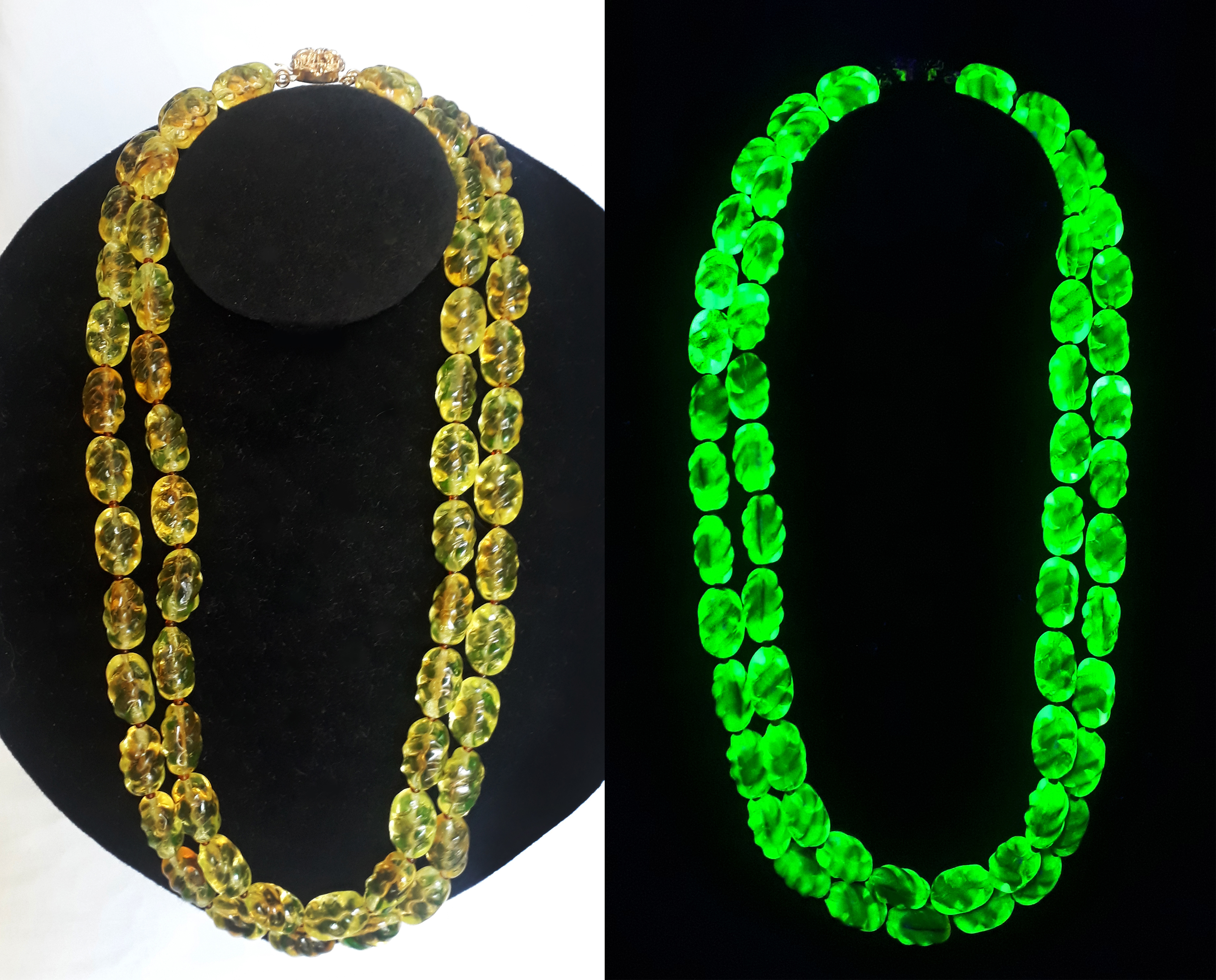
Uranium glass necklace, circa 1930.

At the end of the 19th century, glassmakers discovered that uranium glass with certain mineral additions could be tempered at high temperatures, inducing varying degrees of micro-crystallization. This produced a range of increasingly opaque glasses from the traditional transparent yellow or yellow-green to an opaque white. During the Depression years, more iron oxide was added to the mixture to match popular preferences for a greener glass. This material, technically a glass-ceramic, acquired the name "vaseline glass" because of its supposedly similar appearance to petroleum jelly. As of 2014, a few manufacturers continue the vaseline glass tradition: Fenton Glass, Mosser Glass, Gibson Glass and Jack Loranger.

US production of uranium glasses ceased in the middle years of World War II because of the government's confiscation of uranium supplies for the Manhattan Project from 1942 to 1958. After the restrictions in the United States were eased, several firms resumed production of uranium glass, including Fenton and Mosser; though uranium was still regulated as a strategic material. Following the Cold War, restrictions on uranium glass were completely lifted. During this time many older pieces entered the free market and new pieces continued to be produced in small quantities into the 2000s.

Riihimäki Glass produced uranium glass designer pieces after World War II.

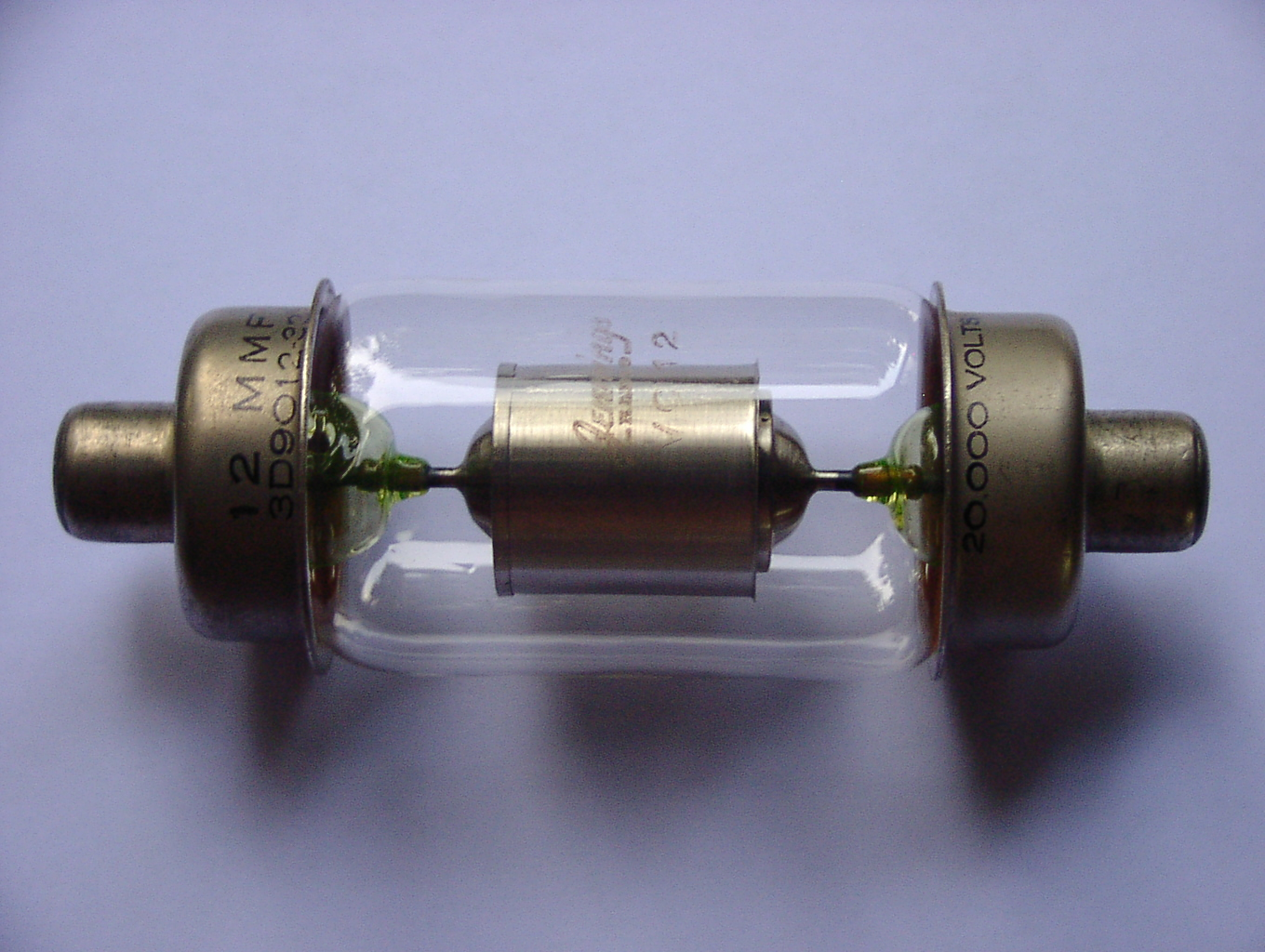
Uranium glass used as lead-in seals in a vacuum capacitor

Uranium glass is used as one of several intermediate glasses in what is known to scientific glass blowers as a 'graded seal'. This is typically used in glass-to-metal seals such as tungsten and molybdenum or nickel based alloys such as Kovar, as an intermediary glass between the metal sealing glass and lower expansion borosilicate glass.

== Health concerns ==
Uranium glass can register above background radiation on a sufficiently sensitive Geiger counter, although most pieces of uranium glass are considered to be harmless and only negligibly radioactive. A study conducted on uranium glass in a private collection found that the dose rates of beta and gamma radiation emitted from the glass posed no danger to the public or to conservators.

== See also ==
- Carnival glass
- Depression glass
- Fiestaware
- Sievert
- Uranium tile
