= Continental Can Company =

Former American metal container company

Continental Can Company (CCC) was an American producer of metal containers and packaging company, that was based in Stamford, Connecticut.

The Continental Can Company was founded by Edwin Norton T.G. Cranwell in 1904, three years after the formation of its greatest rival, American Can Company. Continental acquired the patents of United Machinery Company, one of the few companies producing can-making machinery that had not been bought by American Can. CCC began shipping product in 1905.

During World War II, Continental Can Company helped the war effort by building aircraft parts and bombs in their manufacturing plants. The United Steelworkers of America was the union representing hundreds of manufacturing workers at Continental Can Company.

In 1956, CCC acquired the Hazel-Atlas Glass Company, the third largest producer of glass containers, which led to the 1964 United States v. Continental Can Co. ruling regarding market segmentation by the Supreme Court.

== History ==
The company bought the Standard Tin Plate Company in 1909 to ensure that they would have a steady supply of tin. Continental's original business consisted only of packers' cans for fruits and vegetables. Given the seasonal nature of this work, the company expanded into general canning in 1912. By 1913 the company had acquired all of the interests of a New Jersey corporation also called Continental Can Co., as well as the Export & Domestic Can Co. and the Standard Tin Plate Co. The same year, Continental was incorporated in the state of New York.

During the 1920s Continental expanded rapidly, purchasing almost 20 competing companies. It opened its first West Coast plant in 1926. In 1928 Continental acquired the third-largest can company in the country, the United States Can Company. By 1934 Continental and its rival, American Can, were producing approximately two-thirds of the 10 million cans made annually in the US. At this time, the company was operating 38 plants in the US and Cuba. Continental suffered a drop in its income during the Depression, although by 1932 the company had never reported a money-losing year.

By the mid-1930s, with 38 plants nationwide, the company employed about 1,800 men and 1,200 women around the Chicago area.

Continental recovered from the Depression years, and by 1940 its operating revenue had increased to $120.7 million from $80.9 million in 1935. In 1940 the company built plants in Canada. Continental expanded during the following decade through acquisitions, and the company entered the fields of paper and fiber containers, bottle caps, and synthetic resins. By the end of the 1940s, the company had 65 plants, including eight plants producing fiber and paper containers, four plants producing crown caps, and one plant producing plastics. By 1954 the company's gross sales reached $616 million, and its net income was approximately $21 million. At that time, Continental was operating 81 plants.

During the company's first 50 years, it had purchased and absorbed 28 independent can companies, as well as other concerns producing fiber drums, paper containers, and bottle tops. In 1956 Continental acquired Hazel-Atlas Glass Co., the third-largest US manufacturer of glass containers. Continental then became the first company with a full line of containers in metal, paper, and glass. It also purchased Cochrane Foil Company, a manufacturer and distributor of aluminum plates and rigid foil packages for the frozen-food industry and other food suppliers. The company also bought Robert Gair Company, a leading producer of paperboard products. Due to such acquisitions, Continental briefly surpassed American Can's annual sales, topping $1 billion in 1957.

CAB Accident Report, Continental Can Company plane crash

On July 1, 1959, one of the company's executive aircraft, a Martin B-26C, crashed near in Marion, Ohio en route from Midway Airport to Baltimore, killing eight executives and two company pilots. The executives were returning to Continental's New York headquarters after a meeting in Chicago.

The introduction of the easy-to-open metal can top in 1963 led to an increase in the use of metal cans rather than glass bottles for beverages. By the end of 1966 over 45% of US beer and over 15% of US soft drinks were packaged in metal cans. That same year Continental introduced the first commercially-practical welded can. In 1969 the company acquired Schmalbach-Lubeca-Werke A.G., the largest packaging producer in the European community. With the rise in demand and acquisitions, Continental went from 155 plant facilities in 1960 to 228 manufacturing plants in 1969.

By 1973 the metal can industry was in a crisis due to oversupply and tough competition. Both Continental and American Can were said to have made the wrong decisions in the previous decade by adding capacity for both tin plate and tin-free steel production while the aluminum can was gaining popularity. Another problem was growing public opposition to disposable cans. Continental's profits from domestic can making dropped from $115 million in 1969 to $52 million in 1973. The company closed many old-style integrated manufacturing plants in favor of large automated metal-processing centers and separate can-assembly operations situated near its customers' plants. In 1973 the company developed a system for the ultraviolet curing of inks and coatings on metal plate, and installed a number of such systems.

=== Continental Group ===
In 1976, CCC changed its name to the Continental Group, a conglomerate with operations in many countries, but kept "Continental Can" as its packaging unit within Continental Group. In 1987, the remnants of Continental Can became part of the United States Can Company (a subsidiary of Inter-American Packaging) and two of its executives left to form Silgan Holdings. Continental Group was dismantled in 1991. In early 1991, Continental Can Company was ordered to pay $415 million to some 3,700 former employees and members of the United Steel Workers of America, when the courts found that the company had attempted to defraud the employees of pensions during the late 1970s. The rights to the name "Continental Can Company" name and logo were sold in 1991 and renamed to the Viatech Continental Can Company, Inc. in October 1992. In June 1998 Suiza Foods Corporation completed its acquisition of Continental Can. In July 1999, Suiza sold all of Continental Can's US packaging operations in partial exchange for a minority interest in the purchaser, Consolidated Container Company. As of 2000, the only remaining business of Continental Can is Dixie Union, a small flexible film business based in Kempten, Germany.

=== Deals ===
Deals included:

- 1945 Continental Can Company, Inc.: 150,000 shares of $3.75 cumulative preferred stock
- 1951 Continental Can Company, Inc.: 104,533 shares $4.25 cumulative second preferred stock (without par value) $15,000,000 3 1/4% debentures due October 15, 1976
- 1960 Continental Can Company, Inc.: $30,000,000 4 5/8% debentures due October 1, 1985
- 1970 Continental Can Company, Inc.: $60,000,000 principal amount 8 1/2% sinking fund debentures due August 1, 1990
- 1974 Continental Can Company, Inc.: 8.85% sinking fund debentures due May 15, 2004

=== Facilities ===
- Stamford, Connecticut (Headquarters)
- Chicago, Illinois
- Itasca, Illinois
- Coffeyville, Kansas
- Roanoke, Virginia
- Dayton, OH
- St. Louis, MO
- Syracuse, New York
- Elwood, Indiana
- Los Angeles, California
- Union City, California
- Seattle, Washington (cans: Plant 13, machinery: Plant 31)
- Portland, Oregon
- Omaha, Nebraska
- Olympia, Washington
- Milwaukee, Wisconsin
- North Collins, New York
- Baltimore, Maryland
- Paterson, NJ
- Passaic, NJ (factory on corner of Main Ave. and Brook Ave. along railroad line)
- West Mifflin, PA
- Oil City, PA
- Houston, TX Fiber Drums
- Cleveland, Ohio Purchased Hankins Container Company Late 1950s
- Toronto, Ontario Plants 54, 483, 639
- Montreal, Quebec Plant 59
- Winnipeg, Manitoba
- Edmonton, Alberta
- Vancouver, British Columbia
- Malden, Massachusetts Plant 57 (closed 1984)
- Weirton, West Virginia
- Tampa, Florida
- Vicksburg, Mississippi Plant 459
- Lima, Ohio Plant 475

Tonawanda, NY paperboard plant

=== Chairmen ===
- Lucius D. Clay from 1950 to 1962
- Donald J. Bainton from 1989 to 1998
