= Fenton Art Glass Company =

Glass manufacturer

- Type: Private company
- Founded: Martins Ferry, Ohio (1905)
- Headquarters: Williamstown, West Virginia, United States
- Number of employees: 120
- Website: http://www.fentonartglass.com/

The Fenton Art Glass Company is a glass manufacturer founded in 1905 by brothers Frank L. Fenton and John W. Fenton.

== History ==
The original factory was in an old glass factory in Martins Ferry, Ohio, in 1905. The factory at one time was owned by the former West Virginia Glass Company. At first they painted glass blanks from other glass makers, but started making their own glass when they became unable to buy the materials they needed. They moved across the Ohio River to Williamstown, West Virginia, and built a factory in 1906. The first year for glass production was 1907. In 1908 John Fenton left the company and founded the Millersburg glass company in Millersburg, OH.

Frank Fenton was the designer and decorator. From 1905 to 1920, the designs made there were heavily influenced by two other glass companies: Tiffany and Steuben. But the many different colors were the work of Jacob Rosenthal, a famous glass chemist who is known for developing chocolate and golden agate glass. Towards the end of 1907, the Fenton brothers were the first to introduce carnival glass, which later became a popular collector's item.

During the Great Depression and World War II, Fenton produced practical items (such as mixing bowls and tableware) due to shortages. At the same time, they continued creating new colors. Towards the end of the Great Depression they also produced perfume bottles for the Wrisley Company in 1938. The bottles were made in French opalescent glass with the hobnail pattern.

In 1940, Fenton started selling Hobnail items in French Opalescent, Green Opalescent and Cranberry Opalescent. The Hobnail pattern glass would become the top-selling line and allowed the Fenton company to exist during WWII and to expand after the war.

In the late 1940s, the top three members of Fenton's management died. Frank Fenton and Wilmer C. "Bill" Fenton immediately stepped in and took over the positions of President and Vice President, respectively. Over the next thirty years, they continued to expand Fenton Art Glass, despite a large number of glass factories closing down.

In 1986, George W. Fenton, Frank's son, took over as President of the company.

== Maker marks ==
In 1970, the company added their logo to the bottom of their "Original Formula" Carnival Glass pieces to distinguish them from their older Carnival Glass pieces. By 1974, Fenton was putting their logo on some of the pieces they made. Pieces made in the 1980s have the number eight under the letter "n" in the logo, pieces from the 1990s have the number nine and pieces made in the 2000s have a 0 in the same place. From June 1996 to July 1998 Fenton marked preferred seconds sold in their gift shop with a sandblasted solid or hollow star. In August 1998 an F replaced the star.

Another type of mark is found on glass baskets. Where the glass handles of the baskets are attached to the base of the basket a stamp is made. Each handler had a specific pattern to help identify which handler attached the handle. The marks began in the 1950s and were instituted by Frank M. and Bill Fenton.

== Item codes ==
Fenton used a coding system to describe the items it produced. The code used numbers for the pattern and letters for the color. There were also letter codes for any decorations.

== Patterns ==
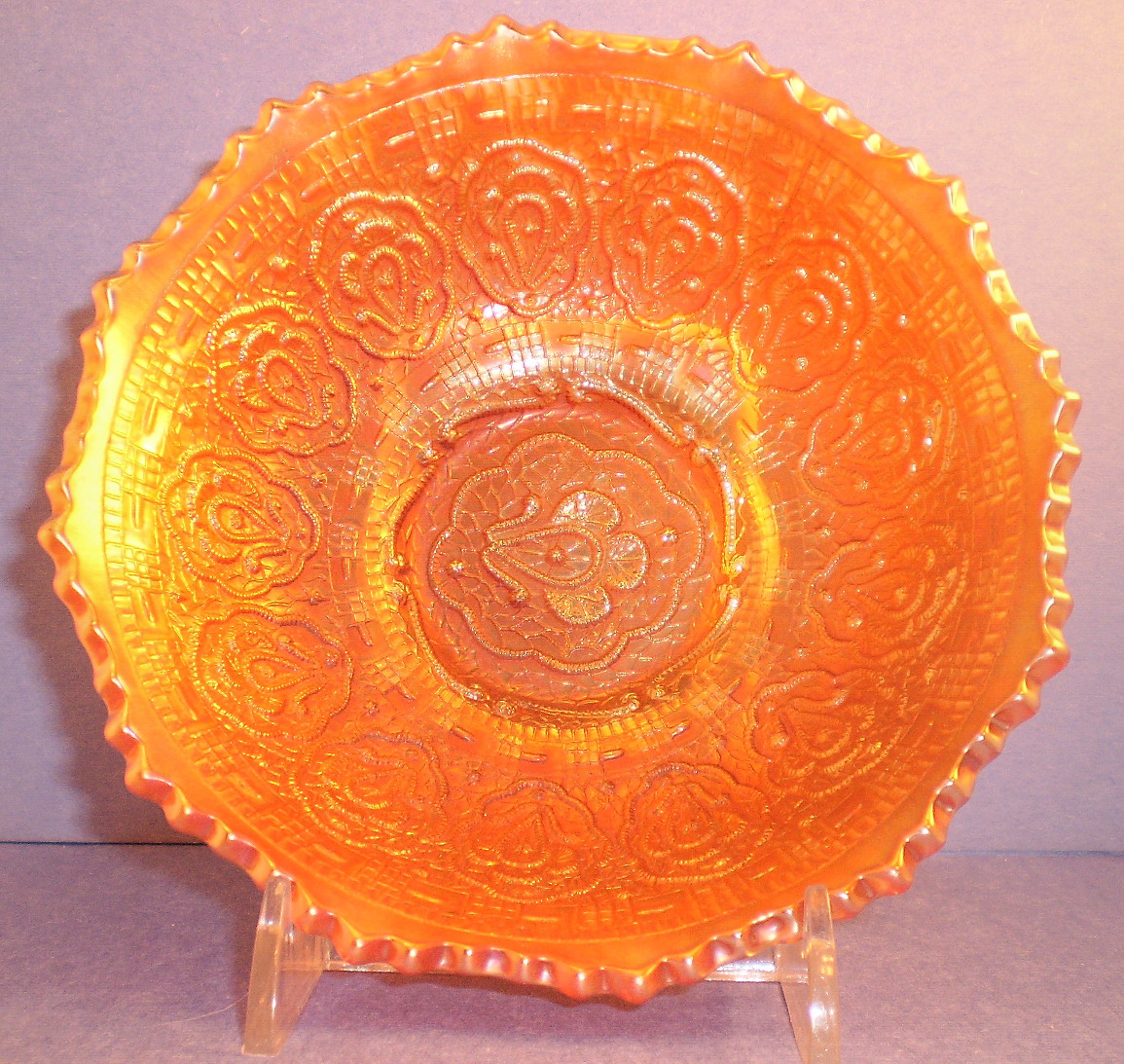
Persian Medallion in marigold

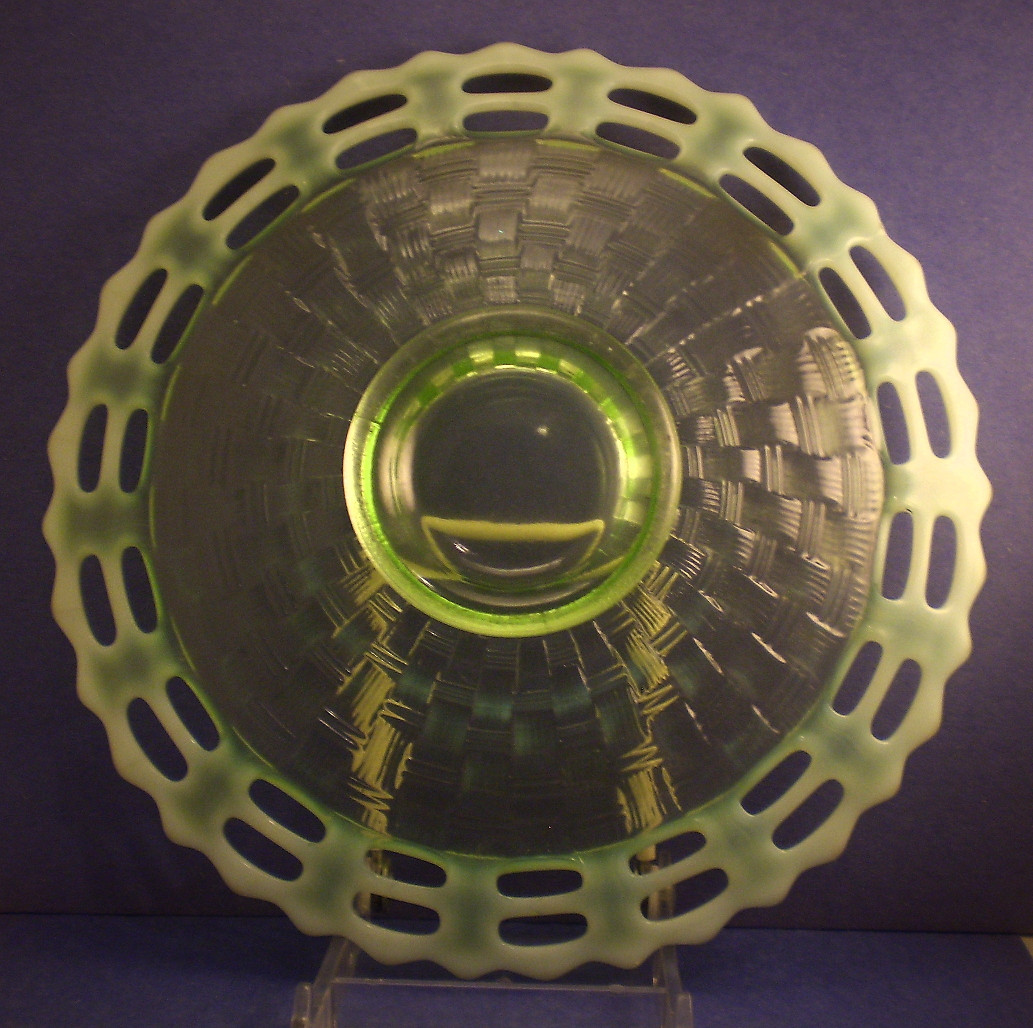
Green opalescent Basket Weave plate

Some of the patterns used on items produced by Fenton were:

Name	Years Produced	Description	Reference
Cherry Chain		Distinguished by groups of cherries in a circular pattern.	
Coin Dot	1947, 1952–54, 1956–64	A pattern made by using opalescent glass that was a copy the Polka Dot Victorian pattern.	
Dragon and Lotus		This pattern is possibly available in more colors than other patterns.	
Hobnail		An even arrangement of bumps similar to that found on the bottom parts of hobnail boots.	
Open Edge		Also referred to as Basket weave. The pattern is on the outside of the bowl, basket, or plate and the edge has two rows of holes around it. Three rows of holes were also made.	
Panther		This is an interior pattern showing two large cats, the outside pattern is Butterfly and Berry. All pieces have balled feet.	
Persian Medallion		Embroidered medallions in a ring. Used on plates, bowls, and bonbons.	

== Colors and combinations ==
Fenton made hundreds of different colors of glass over the time they were open.

Carnival colors The color of carnival glass is the color of the applied treatment not the color of the piece of glass.

Name	Years Produced	Description	Reference
Amberina		A fiery red blended to yellow.	
Amethyst		A deep to pale purple.	
Blue		Pale to deep blue.	
Cobalt Blue		A deep shade of blue and the most sought after.	
Independence Blue	1975-76	A cobalt blue carnival treatment made during the U.S.Bicentennial.	
Green		This color ranges from a deep green to a light yellow green.	
Marigold		A yellow orange color.	
Red		A red color that is deep when held to a light.	
Rich Marigold		Orange-red in appearance.	

Opalescent colors

Name	Years Produced	Description	Reference
Amethyst Opalescent			
Blue Opalescent	1959-64, 1978–81	Appears at odd times after 1907 till 1959.	
Cameo Opalescent	1920's, 1979–82	Brown to tan in color.	
Cranberry Opalescent	1956-1989	Mainly made in hobnail and coin dot pattern molds.	
French Opalescent	1956-68, 1980	Also called Crystal. Clear class. Made in hobnail, Coin Dot molds, also Mandarin and Empress vases.	
Green Opalescent	1959-61	Can be a jade color to a lime green.	
Plum Opalescent	1959-62	Created by attempting to make a cranberry opalescent that could be used in pressed molds. A deep purple color.	
Topaz Opalescent	1940-44, 1959–62, 1980	A yellow uranium glass. Used in Hobnail, Coin Dot, Cactus, and Lily of the Valley pattern molds.	

Crests This color combination consists of glass of a different color added to the rim of a piece.

Name	Years Produced	Description	Reference
Aqua Crest	1940-42, 48-53	Milk Glass with a blue edge.	
Black Rose	1953-54	Peach Blow with a black edge.	
Blue Ridge	1939	French Opalescent with a blue edge.	
Crystal Crest	1942	Milk glass with a double row of crystal and white glass.	
Emerald Crest	1949-55	Also called Green Crest in 1949.	
Gold Crest	1943-45	Yellow glass on the edge of Milk glass items.	
Ivory Crest	1940-41	Custard glass with a crystal edge.	
Peach Crest	1940-69	A cased glass with milk glass on the outside and ruby on the inside with a crystal edge.	
Silver Crest	1943 onwards	A crystal edge on milk glass.	

Marble or slag A type of glass that is opaque and streaked. It is usually a glass pressed in molds rather than being blown.

Name	Years Produced	Description	Reference
Blue Marble	1970-73	Blue with swirls of white.	
Chocolate Glass	1907-1910, 1976	Also called Carmel slag. Created by glass maker Jacob Rosenthal.	

Overlays Overlays are a type of cased glass. Cased glass is made up of different colors in layers.

Name	Years Produced	Description	Reference
Apple Green overlay	1961	A light green glass over milk glass.	
Blue overlay	1943-53, 1967, 1971	Blue glass over milk glass.	
Coral overlay	1961	A peach glass over milk glass.	
Gold overlay	1949	Milk glass with an amber overlay.	
Green overlay	1949-53	Milk glass covered in green glass.	
Ivy	1949-52	Dark green over white glass.	
Rose overlay	1943-48	Milk glass cased with light pink glass.	
Shelly Green overlay	1967	Colonial green over milk glass, used only on lamps.	

Vasa Murrhina is a cased glass; the name means vessel of gems. This type of glass has a long history pre-dating Fenton. Frank M. Fenton had glass chemist Charles Goe develop a way to make it since the way it was made was long forgotten. The piece starts out as a ball of glass that is rolled in small pieces of broken glass called frit. Then another layer of crystal was gathered over the frit.

Name	Years Produced	Description	Reference
Adventurine Green	1964-68	Blue and green frit over a milk glass base	
Autumn Orange	1965-67	Brown and orange frit over an opal glass base.	
Blue Mist	1965-67	Blue frit over a crystal base.	
Red Mist	1965-67	Red frit over a crystal base.	

Fenton has an extensive line of MILK GLASS that also is offered in an array of patterns.

== Decorations ==
Fenton had a long history of decorating glass that goes back to its beginnings in 1905. The Fenton Art Glass company started out as a decorating company that purchased blanks from glass manufacturers and placed their own decorations on them. Fenton did not manufacture glass until 1907 a year after the Williamstown, WV plant was built.

Decorations found on three or more shapes

Name	Years Produced	Description	Glass type	Code	Reference
Apple Blossom	1969-70	Painted pink flowers.	Silver crest	AB	
Bluebells on Hobnail	1971-72	Painted blue flowers.	Hobnail milk glass	BB	
Bluebirds	1977-79	Painted bluebirds	Custard glass	BC	
Transfer leaves	1970-72	Transfer decoration of oak leaves	Burmese	BD	
Blue Dogwood	1980-82	Blue flowers with five petals. A mistake in naming that stuck because Dogwood only has 4 petals.	Cameo Satin	BL, BQ	
Blue Roses	1978-83	The first item to be painted with the decoration was an egg.	Blue Satin and Custard glass	BL	
Butterflies	1977-78	Butterflies and yellow and blue flowers	Milk glass	BY	
Violets in the snow	1969-84	Tiny violets, also called decorated violets.	Silver crest and Milk glass	DV	

== Closure ==
On August 9, 2007, Fenton Art Glass sent out a press release stating they would "cease... operations over the next few months."

Their plans involved laying off 25 employees immediately, and in the following weeks, the rest of their workers would be laid off. However, on December 4, 2007, Fenton Art Glass released a press statement, saying that due to an unexpected buying frenzy and internal restructuring, the company would stay open until at least the spring of 2008. In an open letter in August 2008, company president George Fenton said that thanks to the buying frenzy, the company had been able to institute some reforms, and would not be closing in the foreseeable future.

On July 6, 2011, Fenton Art Glass sent out a press release stating they would "wind down production of its collectible and giftware glass products."

According to WTAP TV, "The company cites financial challenges since its restructuring in 2007 and recent developments as factors in its decision to shut down its traditional glassmaking business. Fenton Art Glass says it's exploring the sales of one or more of its product lines."

Fenton ceased "traditional" glassmaking at the Williamstown, West Virginia, factory in July 2011. However, the factory remained open as a jewelry making operation, producing handcrafted glass beads and Teardrop earrings. The Fenton Gift Shop, located in the same building, also had a large quantity of glass remaining in their inventory. Visitors to the factory were still able to watch the beadmaking demonstrations and purchase Fenton Art Glass.

In June 2017, Wood County Schools Superintendent John Flint signed an agreement to purchase the land that the former Fenton Glass Factory occupied. In October 2017, it was announced that demolition of the factory buildings would begin by the end of 2017, and that a new school would occupy the factory's employee and visitor parking areas. As of 2018, art glass using the original Fenton mold designs, including the Fenton emblem, continued to be produced at another factory in nearby Ohio, while handcrafted jewelry and hand painted items continued to be offered at the Fenton Art Glass Gift Shop.

== See also ==
- Fairy lamp
