= List of listed buildings in Crimond =

This is a list of listed buildings in the parish of Crimond in Aberdeenshire, Scotland.

== List ==
Name	Location	Date Listed	Grid Ref. (Note: Sometimes known as OSGB36, the grid reference (where provided) is based on the British national grid reference system used by the Ordnance Survey. • "Guide to National Grid". Ordnance Survey. • "Get-a-map". Ordnance Survey.)	Geo-coordinates	Notes	LB Number (Note: Historic Environment Scotland assign a unique alphanumeric identifier to each designated site in Scotland, for listed buildings this always begins with "LB", for example "LB12345".)	Image
Old School And Schoolhouse, Crimond				57°36′05″N 1°54′49″W	Category B	3029	Upload Photo
Rattray House, Outbuildings Walled Gardens, And 3 Sets Of Gatepiers Attached Thereto				57°35′43″N 1°50′45″W	Category B	3039	Upload Photo
Middleton Of Rattray, Farmhouse				57°36′07″N 1°50′43″W	Category C(S)	3036	Upload Photo
Avaig (Former Manse Of Crimond)				57°36′02″N 1°54′42″W	Category C(S)	3031	Upload Photo
Parish Church Of Crimond Including Enclosing Walls Railings And Gates				57°36′03″N 1°54′41″W	Category A	3028	Upload another image
Haddo House Mains Of Haddo				57°36′16″N 1°52′19″W	Category A	3034	Upload Photo
Rattray House Lodge And Gates				57°35′38″N 1°51′26″W	Category B	3037	Upload Photo
Mill Of Crimond				57°36′34″N 1°56′04″W	Category C(S)	3043	Upload Photo
Old Parish Church Of Crimond And Graveyard				57°36′29″N 1°54′51″W	Category B	3030	Upload Photo
Hillhead Farmhouse				57°36′15″N 1°53′50″W	Category C(S)	3032	Upload Photo
Dipplebrae Farmhouse				57°36′01″N 1°52′10″W	Category C(S)	3033	Upload Photo
Mains Of Haddo Steading				57°36′16″N 1°52′18″W	Category C(S)	3035	Upload Photo
Rattray House				57°35′43″N 1°50′46″W	Category B	3038	Upload Photo
Rattray House Home Farm And 2 Houses (One Unoccupied 1967)				57°35′38″N 1°50′45″W	Category B	3040	Upload Photo
Rattray Head Lighthouse, The Ron				57°36′36″N 1°48′59″W	Category B	3042	Upload another image See more images
Rattray, St Mary's Chapel And Graveyard				57°36′28″N 1°51′33″W	Category B	46	Upload Photo
Rattray House, Laundry (Disused) N. Of House				57°35′46″N 1°50′45″W	Category C(S)	3041	Upload Photo

== Key ==
The scheme for classifying buildings in Scotland is:

- Category A: "buildings of national or international importance, either architectural or historic; or fine, little-altered examples of some particular period, style or building type."
- Category B: "buildings of regional or more than local importance; or major examples of some particular period, style or building type, which may have been altered."
- Category C: "buildings of local importance; lesser examples of any period, style, or building type, as originally constructed or moderately altered; and simple traditional buildings which group well with other listed buildings."

In March 2016 there were 47,288 listed buildings in Scotland. Of these, 8% were Category A, and 50% were Category B, with the remaining 42% being Category C.

== See also ==
- List of listed buildings in Aberdeenshire
