= The Lord's My Shepherd =

Christian hymn

- Christian hymn/Metrical Psalm
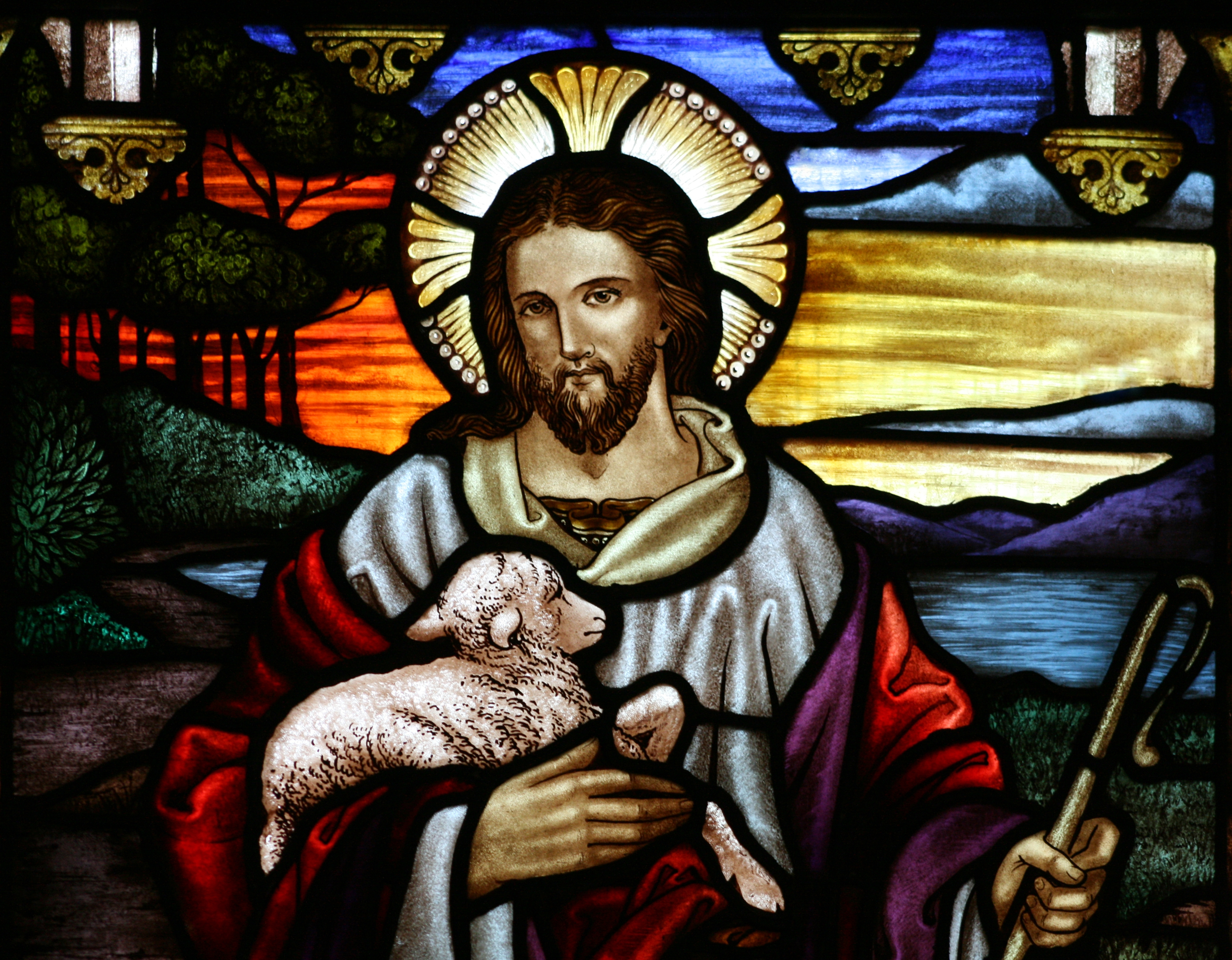
- Stained glass window depicting Jesus as the Good Shepherd
- Written: c. 1650
- Text: Metrical translation attributed to Francis Rous
- Based on: Psalm 23
- Meter: 8.6.8.6
- Melody: Crimond by Jessie Seymour Irvine
- Composed: c.1872

"The Lord's My Shepherd" is a Christian hymn. It is a metrical psalm commonly attributed to the English Puritan Francis Rous and based on the text of Psalm 23 in the Bible. The hymn first appeared in the Scots Metrical Psalter in 1650 traced to a parish in Aberdeenshire.

It is commonly sung to the tune Crimond, which is generally credited to Jessie Seymour Irvine.

== History ==
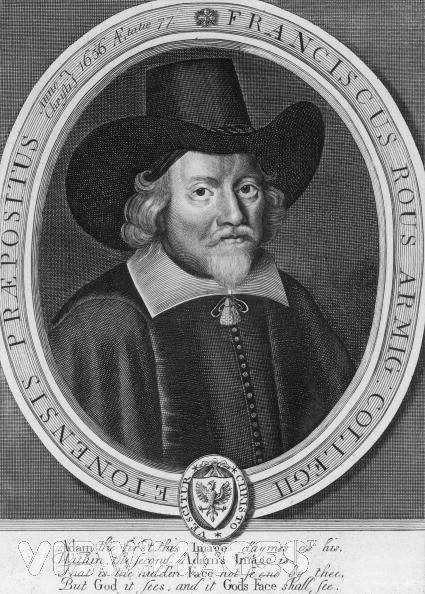
Francis Rous (1579–1659), credited as the author of "The Lord's My Shepherd"

"The Lord's My Shepherd" is based on the words of Psalm 23:

The LORD is my shepherd; I shall not want. He maketh me to lie down in green pastures: he leadeth me beside the still waters.

— Psalm 23

During the Protestant Reformation in Scotland, the practice of exclusive psalmody made Psalm singing a central part of public worship. The Book of Common Order, introduced in the Church of Scotland by reformer John Knox in 1564, contained metrical versions of all the Psalms, adapted from John Calvin's Genevan Psalter (1539). Psalms were sung to Genevan tunes and were only permitted to be sung in unison. Many revisions were published, but by the mid-17th century, the Churches of England and Scotland were both in need of a new translation.

The English lawyer and politician Francis Rous authored a new metrical paraphrase of the Book of Psalms which he published in 1641. Under Oliver Cromwell, Rous had been appointed a member of the Westminster Assembly and was a prominent figure among the English Puritans. Before his Psalms could be approved, they were subjected to scrutiny by the Long Parliament, and a committee of translators was formed to review submissions by Rous and by his rival, William Barton. The committee deliberated for six years and made extensive alterations to the texts.

Although Rous is now credited as the author of "The Lord's My Shepherd", his text was substantially edited after publication. Rous's original version of Psalm 23 read:

My Shepherd is the Living Lord And He that doth me feed
How can I then lack anything whereof I stand in need?

It is estimated that only 10% of Rous's original text was retained in the final version. In England, Barton's version found favour with the English Parliament but it was the Rous version that won approval in Scotland due to its perceived accuracy in translating source texts, and in 1650, General Assembly of the Church of Scotland, the church's ruling body, approved the Rous version for the Scots Metrical Psalter.

== Tune ==
The tune Crimond

"The Lord's My Shepherd"
sung to the tune Brother James's Air

"The Lord's My Shepherd"
sung to the tune Amazing Grace

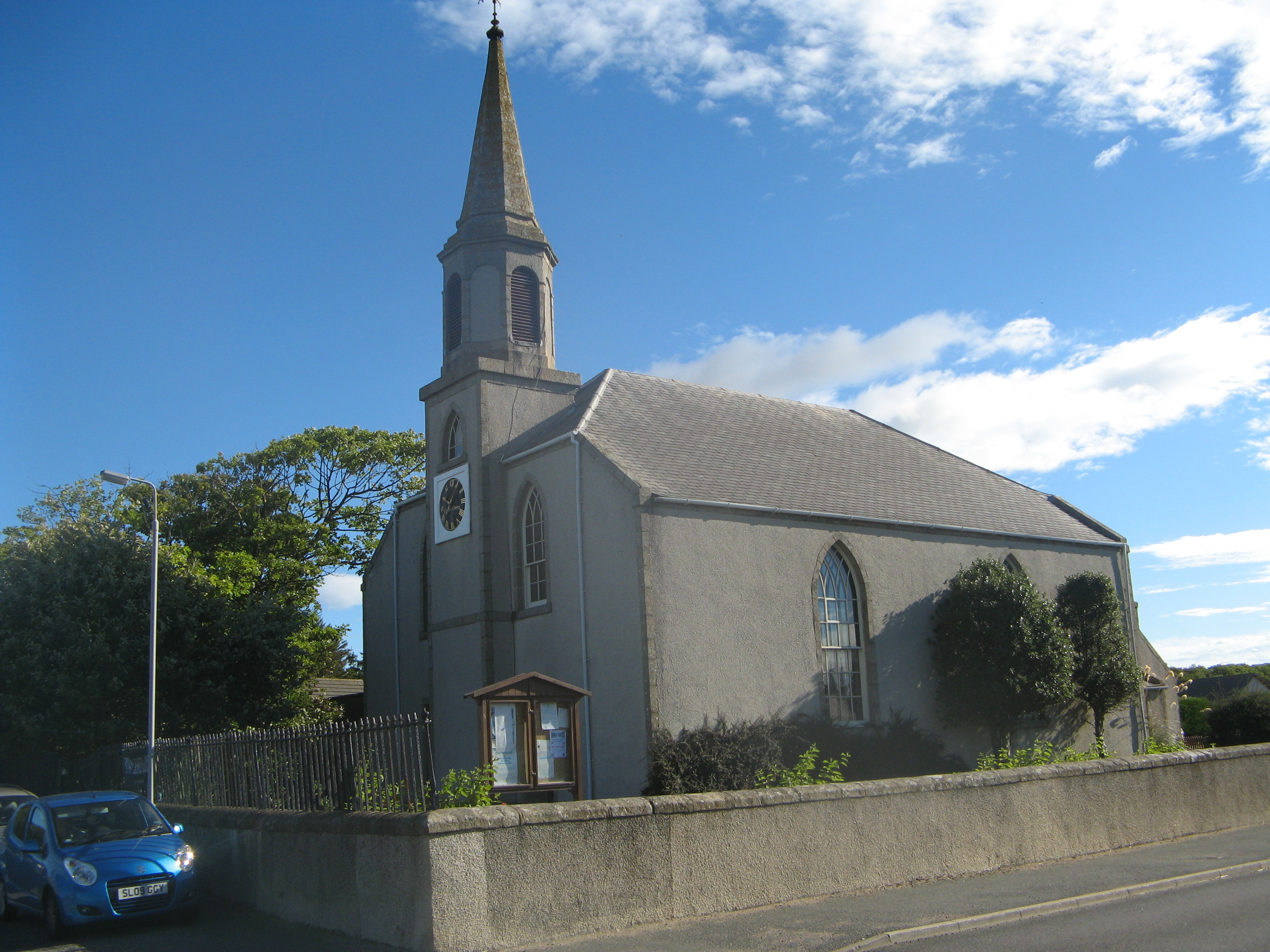
Crimond Parish Church

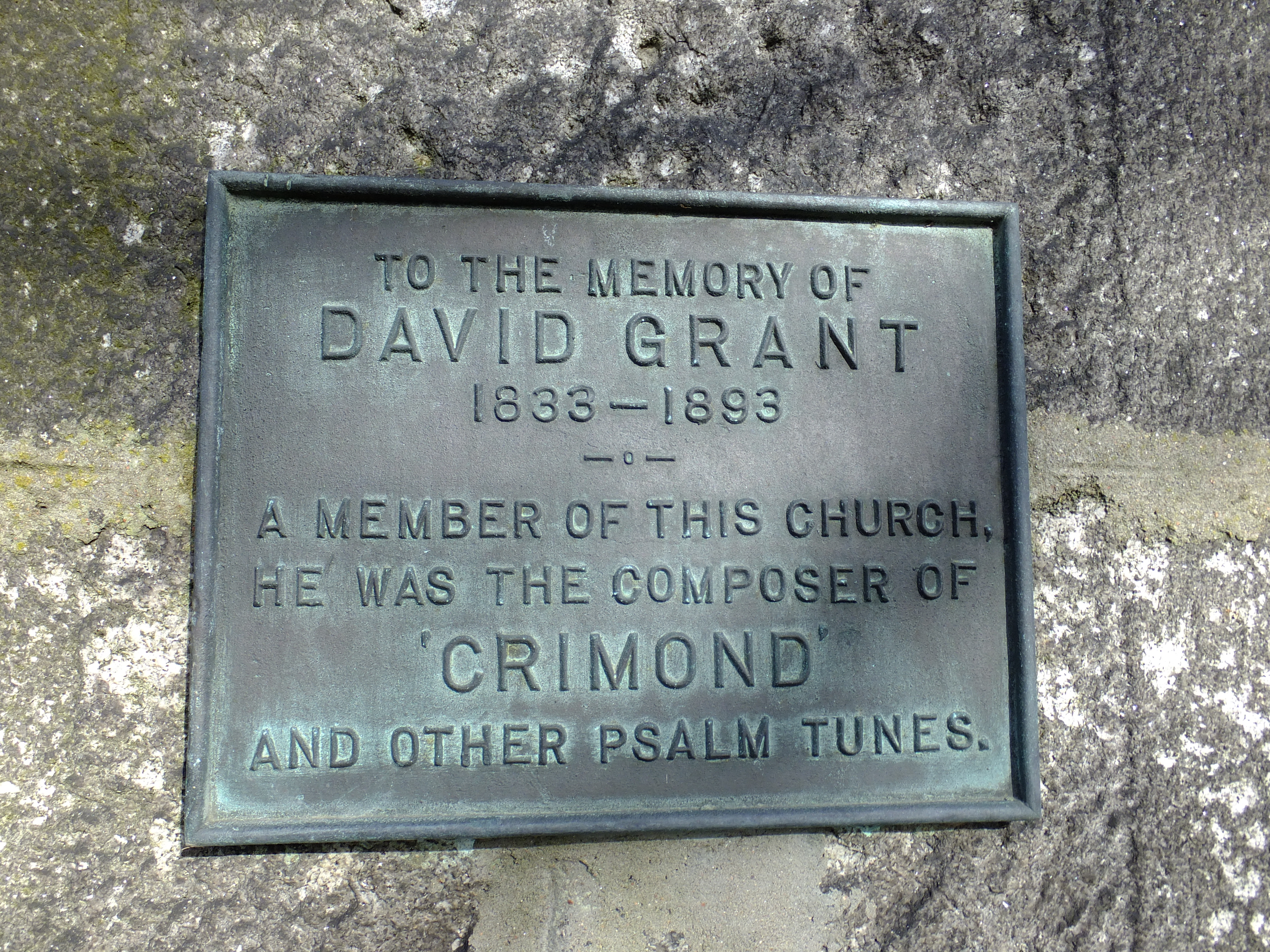
David Grant (1833–1893) plaque

"The Lord's My Shepherd" is in common metre (a metre of 8.6.8.6) and it is most commonly sung to the hymn tune Crimond, named after Crimond Church in the Aberdeenshire town of Crimond. It is thought that this tune was composed by Jessie Seymour Irvine, daughter of Rev. Alexander Irvine, minister of the Crimond Parish. Jessie was a keen musician and was undergoing training as an organist at the nearby town of Banff. According to some accounts, she composed the tune in 1871 as an exercise for a composition class and it was first performed at evening worship at Auchterless Parish Church. Dissatisfied with her own harmonisation, she asked David Grant, a musician from Aberdeen, to reharmonise it for her.

At the time, Grant was collaborating with a group of associates compiling hymns and metrical psalms from across the North of Scotland with the intention of publishing them in a new hymnal. His colleagues were Robert Cooper, precentor of Peterhead Parish Church, William Clubb, precentor at Crimond, and William Carnie, a journalist from Aberdeen. Irvine submitted the tune to Carnie. The Northern Psalter was published in 1872, but with Crimond credited solely to David Grant as its composer. The new hymnal was very successful and sold over 70,000 copies.

Irvine died in 1887, and the attribution of the tune to Grant went unchallenged for many years. In the 1940s, a rival claim emerged in form of a letter written in 1911 by Jessie's sister, Anna Irvine, to the Rev Robert Monteith, then the minister of Crimond Church. In the letter, Anna claimed that the tune had been composed by Jessie and that Grant had only provided the harmony. Anna's account was contested by the editors of The Northern Psalter, who wrote to Monteith claiming that she had confused the tune with another entitled Ballantine that Jessie had composed and submitted to them for publication. After the account provided by Anna's letter was published in the Bulletin of the Hymn Society and The Scotsman newspaper, many hymnals began to credit Irvine instead of Grant as the composer, and the hymn is now regularly—but not universally—attributed to Jessie Seymour Irvine. Anna's claim has latterly been disputed by some scholars who favour Grant, and some hymnals still credit Grant as the composer. The controversy was discussed in Ronald Johnson's 1988 article in the Hymn Society Bulletin, "How far is it to Crimond?", and by the newspaper columnist Jack Webster in the Glasgow Herald, in which he expressed support for the Jessie Irvine claim in his column, based on accounts from Crimond inhabitants who had been personally connected with Irvine.

The putative composers both have memorials; a memorial plaque at St Clement's East Church in Aberdeen commemorates David Grant, a former parishioner there, as the composer, while inside Crimond Parish Church, a set of four etched glass panels installed in 2002 commemorate Jessie Seymour Irvine as the composer.

A later publication of the hymn tune in the 1929 Scottish Psalter was re-harmonised by the editor, Thomas Cuthbertson Leithead Pritchard (1885–1960).

The Crimond setting has proved to be very popular, and has been sung at many notable religious occasions, such as the Wedding of Princess Elizabeth and Philip Mountbatten in 1947, for which occasion a special descant was composed. It was again sung at the State funeral of Queen Elizabeth II in September 2022.

The hymn is sometimes also sung to other tunes such as Brother James's Air by James Leith Macbeth Bain or Martyrdom by Hugh Wilson (1824).

== Text ==
Biblical text (King James Version, 1611)	Rous paraphrase (1641)	Hymn text (Rous, 1650)
^{1} The LORD is my shepherd; I shall not want.	My Shepherd is the Living Lord; And He that doth me feed How can I then lack anything whereof I stand in need?	1. The Lord's my Shepherd, I'll not want; he makes me down to lie in pastures green; he leadeth me the quiet waters by.
^{2}He maketh me to lie down in green pastures: he leadeth me beside the still waters.	|2. In pastures green and flourishing He makes me down to lye: And after drives me to the streames Which run most pleasantly.	
^{3}He restoreth my soul: he leadeth me in the paths of righteousness for his name's sake.	3. And when I feele my selfe neere lost, Then home He me doth take, Conducting me in His right paths, Even for His owne Names sake.	2. My soul he doth restore again, and me to walk doth make within the paths of righteousness, e'en for his own name's sake.
^{4}Yea, though I walk through the valley of the shadow of death, I will fear no evil: for thou art with me; thy rod and thy staff they comfort me.	4. And though I were even at death's doore, Yet would I feare none ill; Thy rod, Thy staff do comfort me, And Thou art with me still.	3.Yea, though I walk through death's dark vale, yet will I fear none ill, for thou art with me; and thy rod and staff me comfort still.
^{5}Thou preparest a table before me in the presence of mine enemies: thou anointest my head with oil; my cup runneth over.	5. Thou hast my table richly stor'd In presence of my foe; My head with oile Thou dost anoint, My cup doth overflow.	4. My table thou hast furnished; in presence of my foes; my head thou dost with oil anoint, and my cup overflows.
^{6}Surely goodness and mercy shall follow me all the days of my life: and I will dwell in the house of the LORD for ever.	6. Thy grace and mercy all my daies Shall surely follow me; And ever in the house of God; My dwelling place shall be.	5. Goodness and mercy all my life; shall surely follow me; and in God's house forevermore my dwelling place shall be.
