= Jessie Seymour Irvine =

Scottish composer (1836–1887)

- Born: 26 July 1836; Dunnottar, Kincardineshire, Scotland
- Died: 2 September 1887 (aged 51); Aberdeen, Scotland
- Known for: Hymn tune Crimond
- Works: "The Lord's my Shepherd"
- Parent(s): Rev Dr Alexander Irvine (1804–1884), Jessie Nicol

Jessie Seymour Irvine (26 July 1836 – 2 September 1887) was the daughter of a Church of Scotland parish minister who served at Dunottar, Peterhead, and Crimond in Aberdeenshire, Scotland. She is best known for being the likely composer of the hymn tune "Crimond", which is commonly used as the music for the hymn "The Lord's My Shepherd". Irvine is referred to by Ian Bradley, in his 1997 book Abide with Me: The World of Victorian Hymns, as standing "in a strong Scottish tradition of talented amateurs who tended to produce metrical psalm tunes rather than the dedicated hymn tunes increasingly composed in England."

== Early life ==
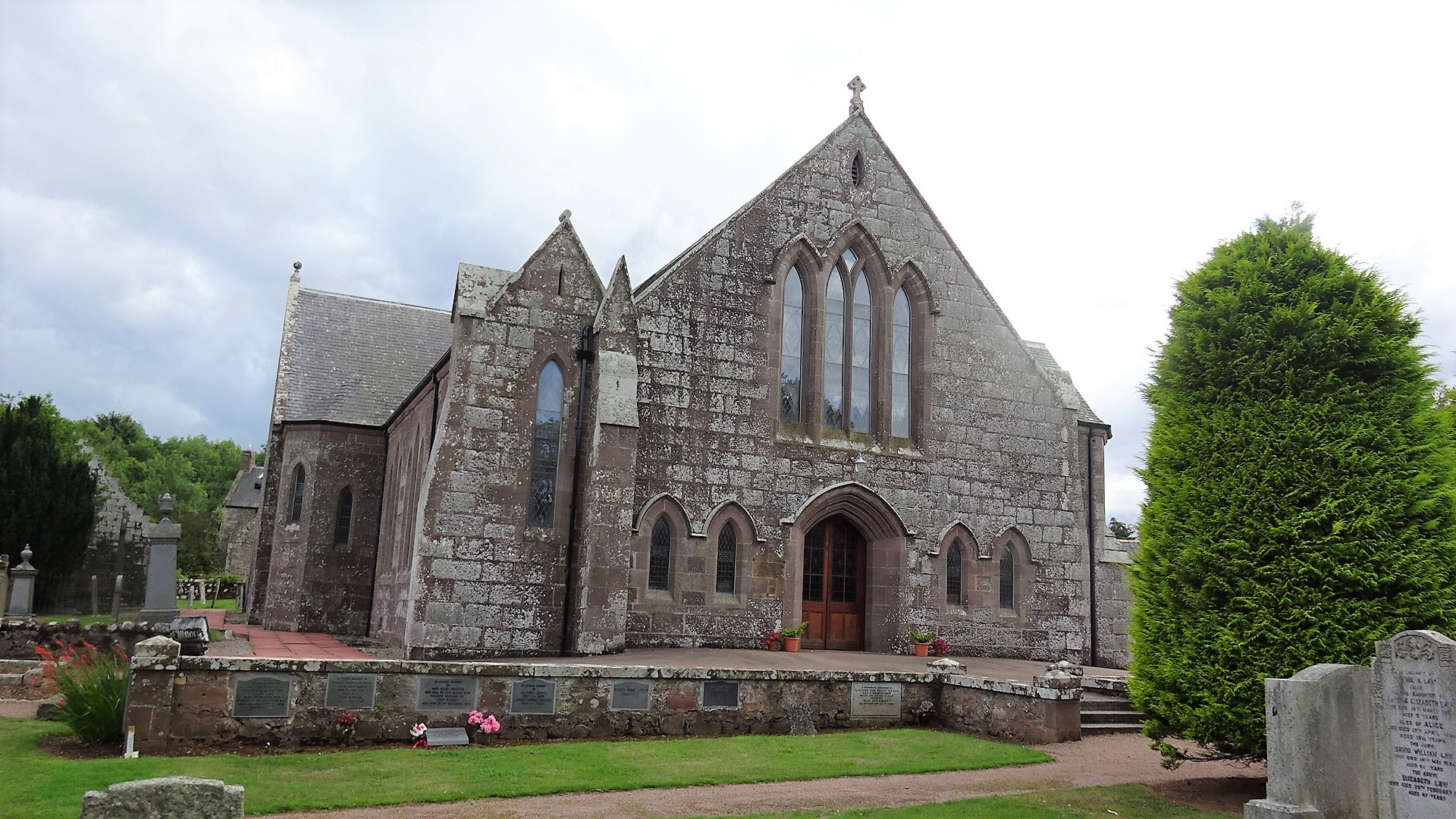
Dunnottar Parish Church, where Jessie's father served as minister

Jessie Seymour Irvine was born in Dunottar in the north-east of Scotland in 1836. She was the daughter of Rev Alexander Irvine, a Church of Scotland minister. Rev Irvine moved to different church appointments in the north-east of Scotland, serving at Dunottar, Peterhead and Crimond.

== "Crimond" composition ==
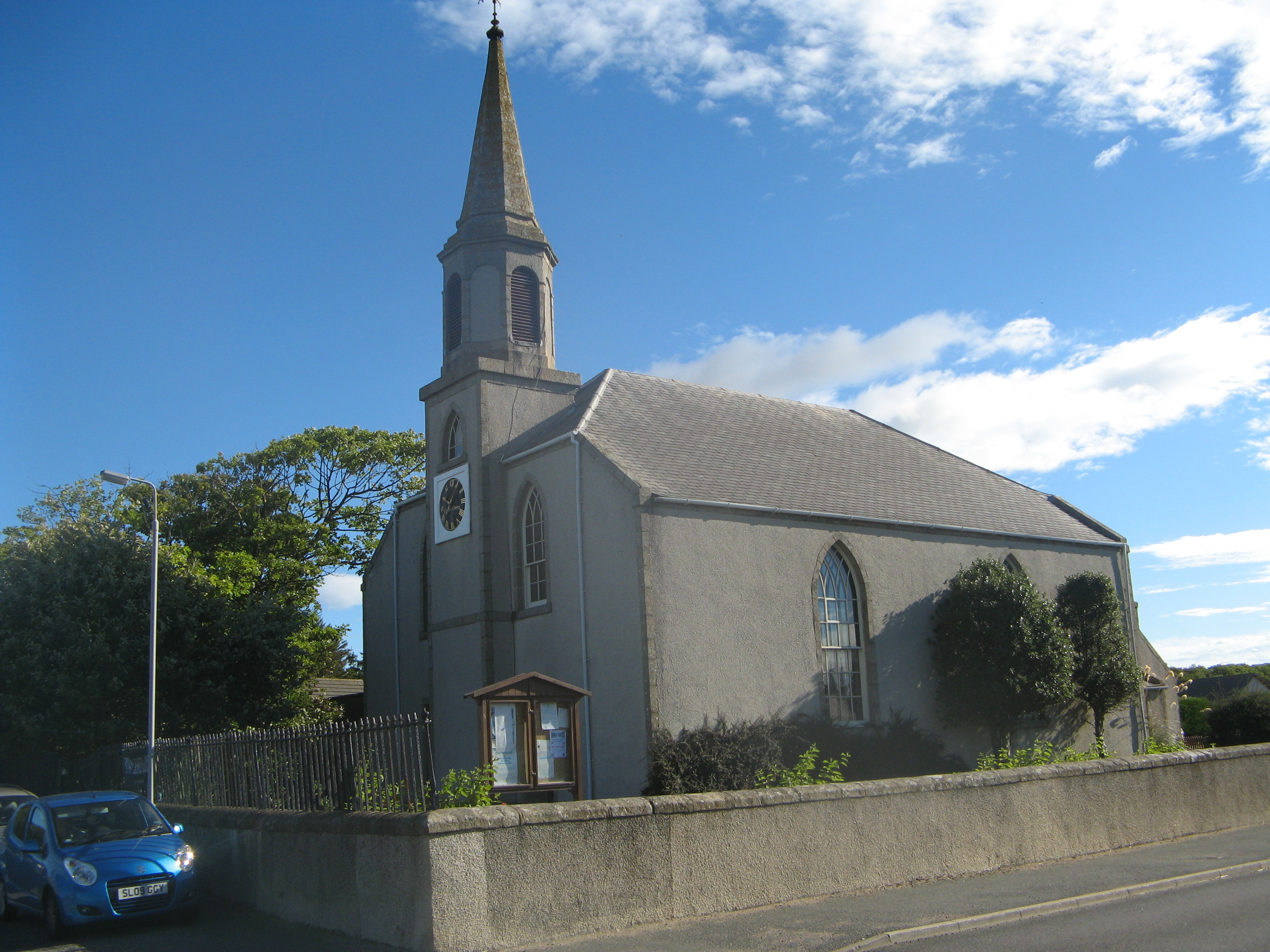
The hymn tune attributed to Jessie was named after Crimond Parish Church

The tune Crimond
The most popular setting for "The Lord's my Shepherd", now generally attributed to Jessie Seymour Irvine

While Rev Irvine was serving at Crimond Church, his teenage daughter Jessie was undertaking training as an organist at the nearby town of Banff. According to some accounts, she composed a tune in 1871 for the metrical version of Psalm 23, "The Lord's My Shepherd", in the Scottish Psalter as an exercise for a composition class. The setting was first performed at evening worship at Auchterless Parish Church. Dissatisfied with her own harmonisation, Jessie asked David Grant, a musician from Aberdeen, to reharmonise it for her.

At the time, Grant was collaborating with a group of associates compiling hymns and metrical psalms from across the North of Scotland with the intention of publishing them in a new hymnal. His colleagues were Robert Cooper, precentor of Peterhead Parish Church, William Clubb, precentor at Crimond, and William Carnie, a journalist from Aberdeen. Irvine submitted the tune to Carnie. The Northern Psalter was published in 1872, but with Crimond credited solely to David Grant as its composer. The new hymnal was very successful and sold over 70,000 copies.

Irvine died in 1887, and the attribution of the tune to Grant went unchallenged for many years. In the 1940s, a rival claim emerged in form of a letter written in 1911 by Jessie's sister, Anna Irvine, to the Rev Robert Monteith, then the minister of Crimond Church. In the letter, Anna claimed that the tune had been composed by Jessie and that Grant had only provided the harmony. Anna's account was contested by the editors of The Northern Psalter, who wrote to Monteith claiming that she had confused the tune with another entitled Ballantine that Jessie had composed and submitted to them for publication. After the account provided by Anna's letter was published in the Bulletin of the Hymn Society and The Scotsman newspaper, many hymnals began to credit Irvine instead of Grant as the composer, and the hymn is now regularly — but not universally — attributed to Jessie Seymour Irvine. Anna's claim has latterly been disputed by some scholars who favour Grant, and some hymnals still credit Grant as the composer. The controversy was discussed in Ronald Johnson's 1988 article in the Hymn Society Bulletin, "How far is it to Crimond?", and by the newspaper columnist Jack Webster in the Glasgow Herald, in which he expressed support for the Jessie Irvine claim in his column, based on accounts from Crimond inhabitants who had been personally connected with Irvine.

Although the authorship of the melody is still disputed, the Crimond setting has become one of the most widely recognised hymn tunes in Christian hymnody. It has been sung at many notable religious occasions, such as the Wedding of Princess Elizabeth and Philip Mountbatten in 1947, for which occasion a special descant was composed. It was again sung at the State Funeral of Queen Elizabeth II at Westminster Abbey on 19 September 2022; the setting was attributed to Jessie Irvine, the harmony credited to David Grant and the descant to William Baird Ross.

== Death and legacy ==
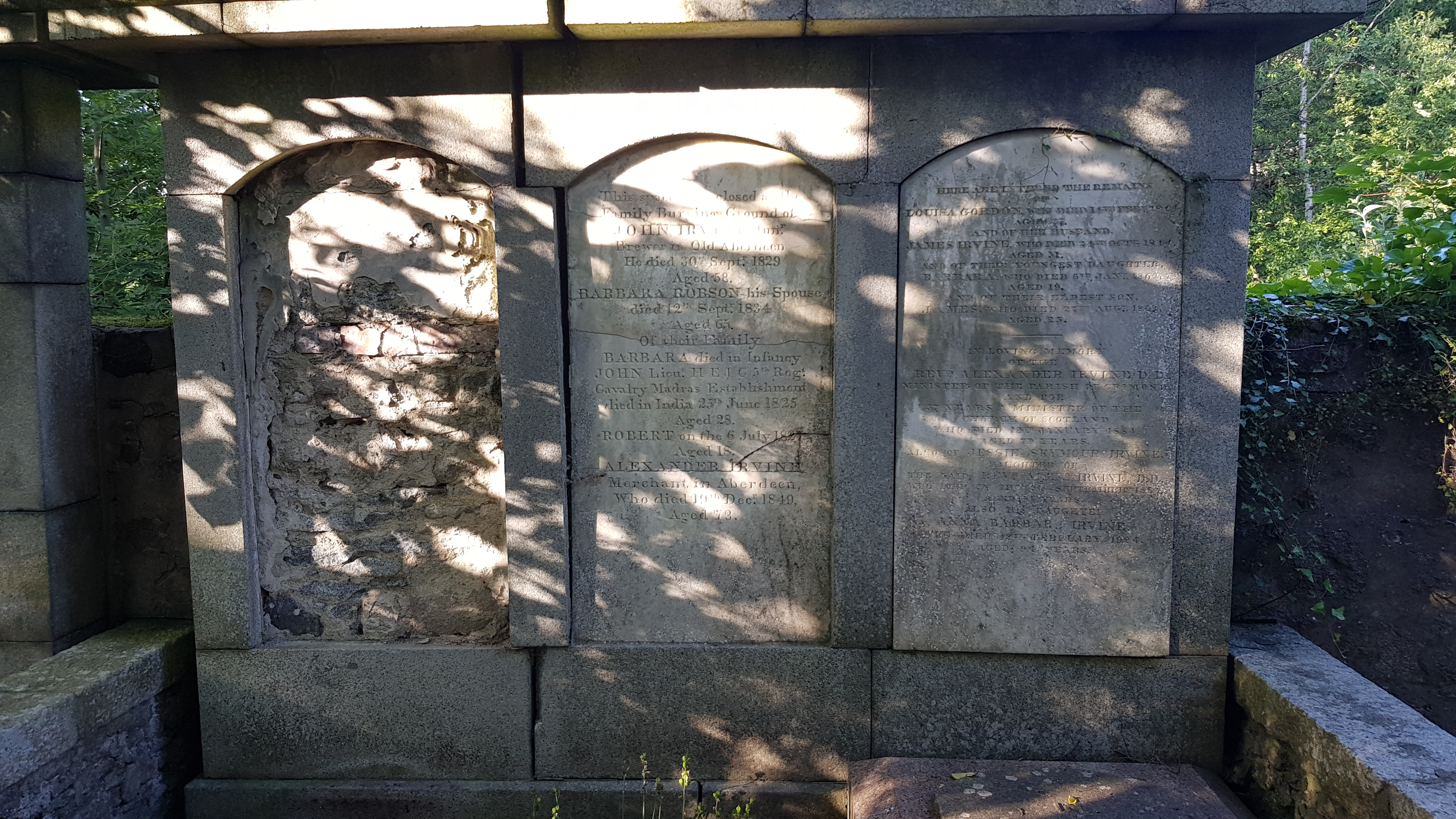
The Irvine family grave in the churchyard of St Machar's Cathedral, Aberdeen

Jessie Seymour Irvine died in 1887 and is buried in the family grave in the churchyard of St Machar's Cathedral in Aberdeen.

She was commemorated by a set of four etched glass panels which were installed inside Crimond Parish Church in 2002.

Irvine is referred to by Ian Bradley, in his 1997 book Abide with Me: The World of Victorian Hymns, as standing "in a strong Scottish tradition of talented amateurs who tended to produce metrical psalm tunes rather than the dedicated hymn tunes increasingly composed in England."
