= Crimond Church =

Coordinates: 57.59400°N 1.91802°W

Crimond Parish Church
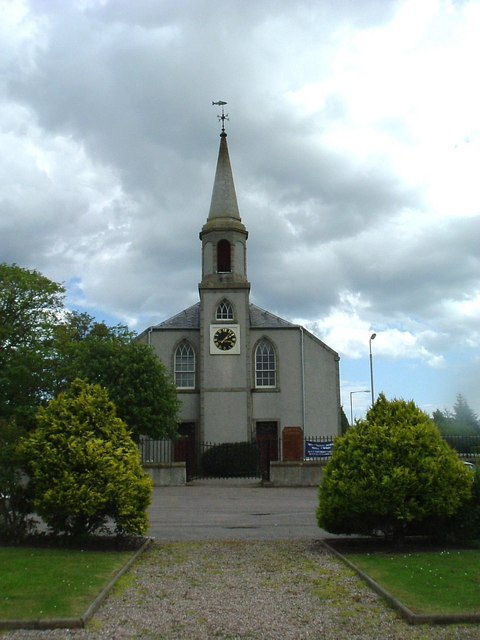
- Crimond Church

- Location within Aberdeenshire
- Location: Crimond, Aberdeenshire
- Country: Scotland
- Denomination: Church of Scotland
- Website: crimondchurch.com

History
- Status: Parish church

Architecture
- Functional status: Active
- Heritage designation: Category A listed
- Designated: 1971
- Architect: Robert Mitchell
- Style: Gothic Revival
- Years built: 1812

Administration
- Parish: Crimond

Crimond Church is a Christian, Church of Scotland Presbyterian church, located on the east side of the A90 road in the centre of the village of Crimond, Aberdeenshire, Scotland at location NK0556. It was built in 1812, to a design by Robert Mitchell, and is a Category A listed building. It is associated with the popular hymn tune "Crimond".

The church celebrated its bicentenary in 2012 with a special service led by The Very Rev. Prof. Alan Main, a former Moderator of the Church of Scotland (1998–99).

== Architecture ==
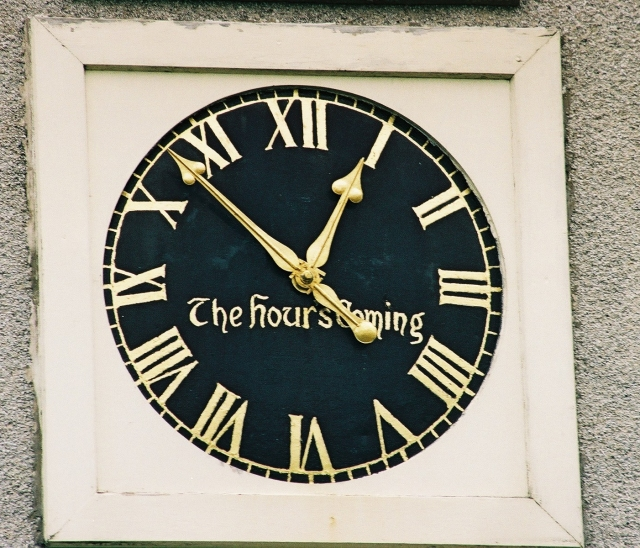
Crimond clock, with 61 minutes

The church clock, bearing the inscription "The hour's coming", has an extra minute between the eleven and twelve making for 61 minutes in the hour. The clock was gifted by Dr James Laing from his Haddo Estate in the early 19th century. The clock is now powered by electricity, but the original mechanical movement is displayed in the church in memory of late councillor Norman Cowie OBE who raised the funds for the electrification of the clock. In 1949, when the clock was being repainted, the extra minute was removed, but thus caused such a furore that it was restored.

The church's fish-shaped weather vane was lost for many years but was found in the 1990s and reinstalled at the top of the spire. The vane had previously been the target of vandalism, showing bullet holes from an air rifle.

The pipe organ is a two-manual instrument built by Conacher and Co., one of only two in Scotland (the other is in St Mary's Cathedral, Aberdeen). It was restored in 1985.

== The Lord's my Shepherd ==
The hymn "The Lord's my Shepherd", a metrical paraphrase of 23rd Psalm, is traditionally sung to the hymn tune Crimond. It is thought that this tune was composed in 1871 by Jessie Seymour Irvine (1836–1887), daughter of the minister, Rev. Alexander Irvine (1804–1884). The tune was first published in The Northern Psalter (1872) but was attributed to David Grant. According to some accounts, Grant had only provided the harmonisation and that it was Irvine who wrote the melody, although this claim has been disputed by some scholars. Hymnals now generally now credit the hymn to Irvine.

A set of four etched glass panels inside the church commemorate Jessie Seymour Irvine as the composer. The panels were installed in 2002 in memory of a previous minister, Rev James E Lyall (d.2002) and are illustrated with imagery of Jesus as the Good Shepherd and with musical notation from the first line of the hymn tune. Both Jessie and her father Alexander are buried in the family grave in the churchyard of St Machar's Cathedral in Aberdeen.

The tune "Crimond"

== Bibliography ==
Henderson, John Alexander (1907). "Crimond". Aberdeenshire epitaphs and inscriptions : with historical, biographical, genealogical, and antiquarian notes / by John A. Henderson. University of Guelph Library. Aberdeen : Printed for the Subscribers, 1907. pp. 70–77.
