= Divine Shepherd =

Divine Shepherd is:

- a designation for Jesus Christ as the Good Shepherd of humanity
- a designation for Psalm 23 which contains the metaphor
