= Old Parish Church, Peterhead =

Church in Peterhead, Scotland

Old Parish Church
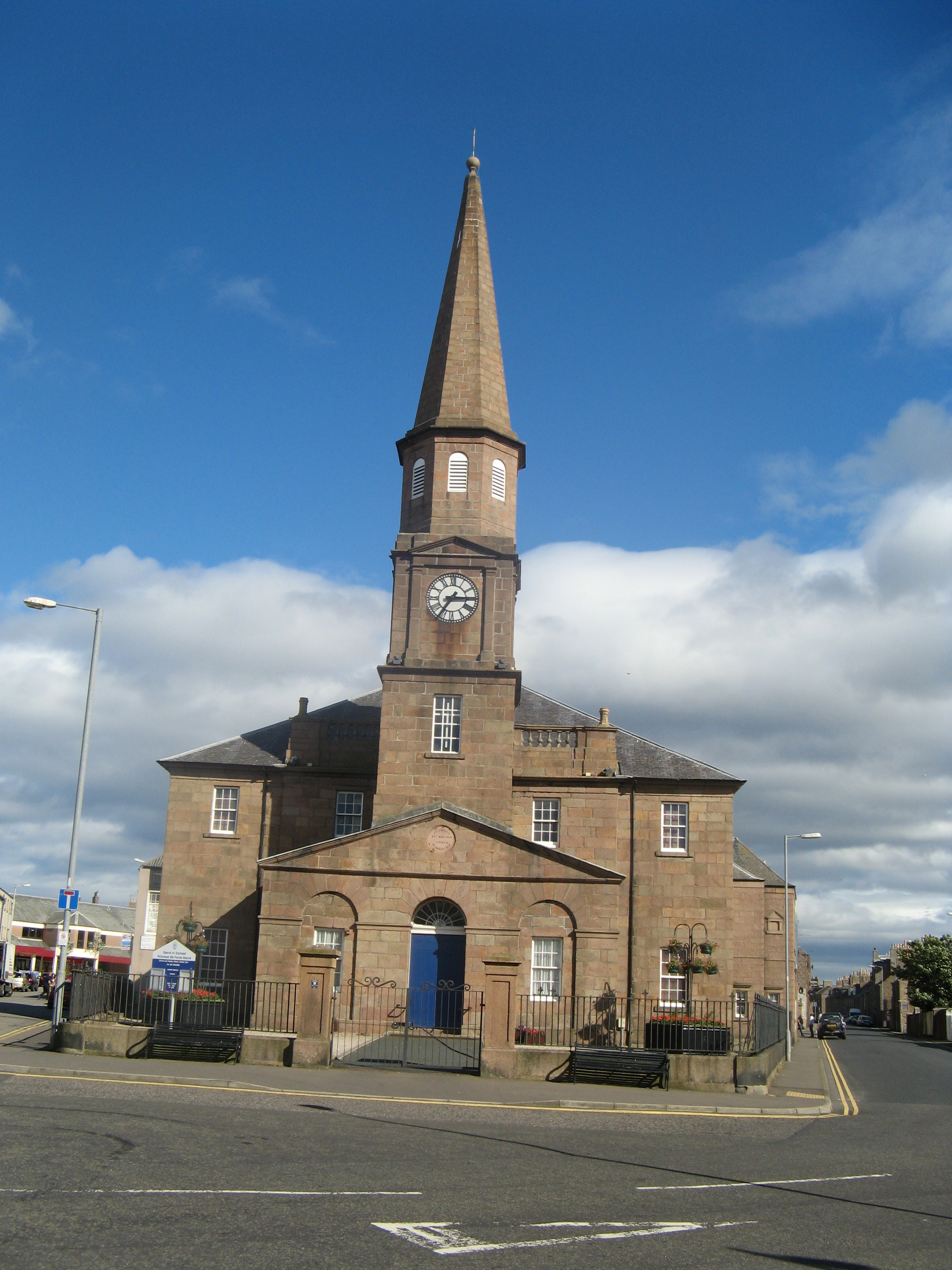
- The church in 2013
- Old Parish Church
- 57°30′18″N 1°46′58″W
- Denomination: Church of Scotland

Old Parish Church (also known as Muckle Kirk) is a Category A listed building located on Maiden Street in Peterhead, Aberdeenshire, Scotland. Local brothers Robert and John Mitchell built the church between 1804 and 1806, to a design by Alexander Laing, of Edinburgh. Its Burgerhuys bell dates to 1647.

The church closed in 2016, and its congregation merged with Peterhead's Trinity Church to form Peterhead New Parish Church.

== Later use ==
The Church of Scotland placed the building on the market in 2023 for offers over £150,000.

In 2024, a martial-arts organisation submitted plans to convert the former church into a training centre and community hub. The business moved its registered office to the Old Parish Church in May 2025.

== Gallery ==
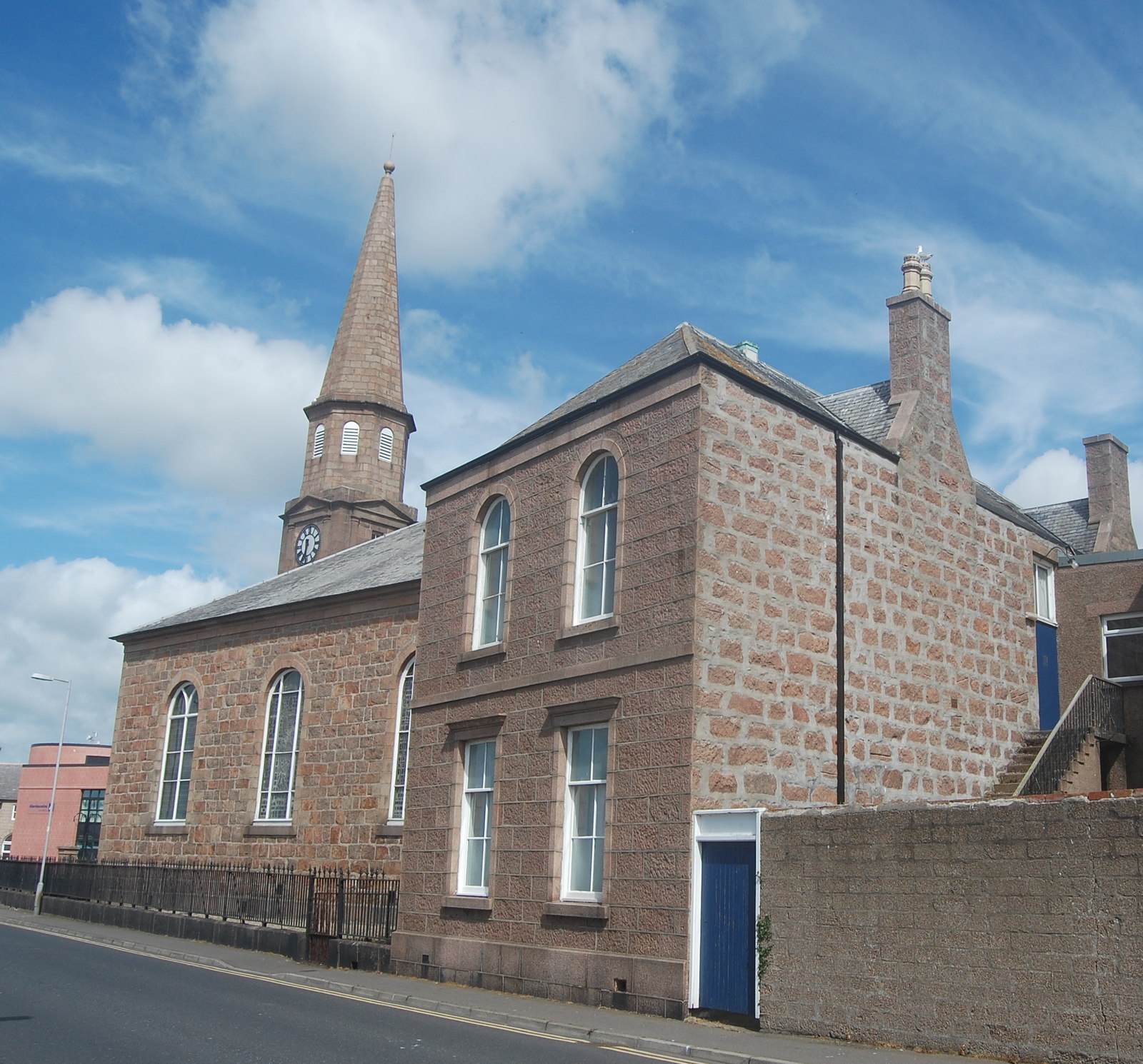
View of the church's southern side from Maiden Street. The church hall, built in 1896, is in the foreground

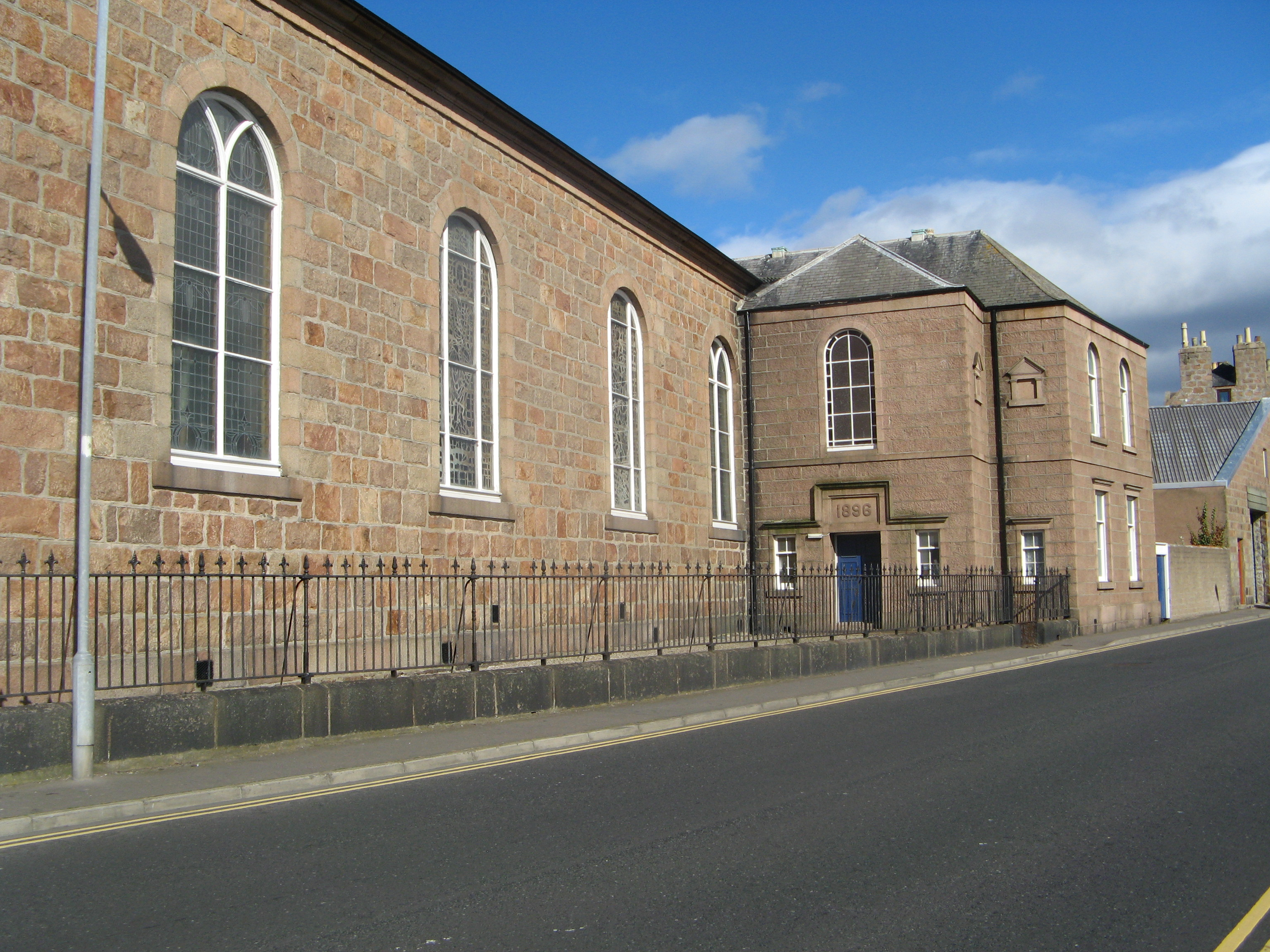
The exterior entrance to the church hall

== See also ==
- List of listed buildings in Peterhead, Aberdeenshire
