= Robert Mitchell (architect) =

Scottish architect

- Born: Scotland

Robert Mitchell was a Scottish architect, prominent in the late 18th century and early 19th century. He worked for a period with his brother and fellow architect John Mitchell.

== Selected works ==
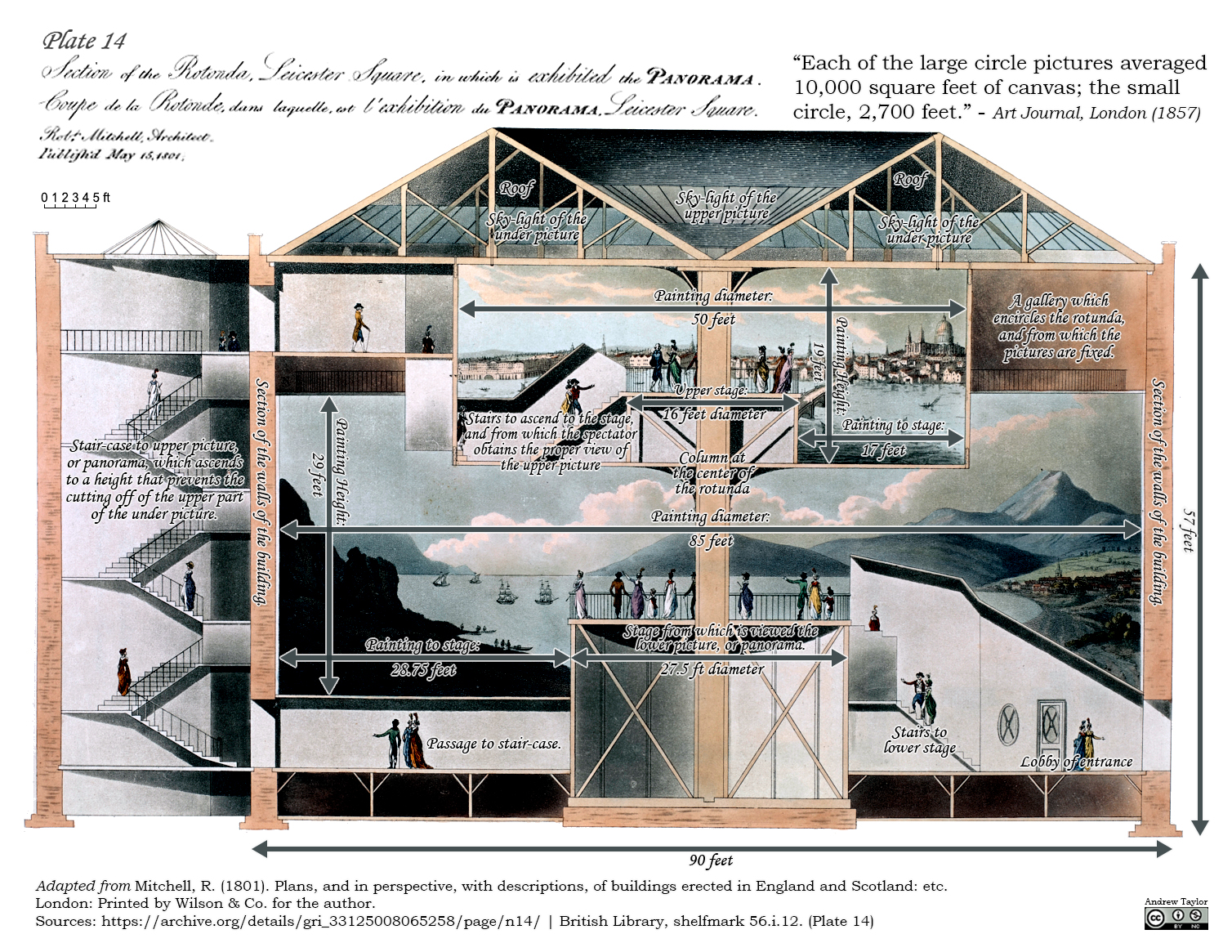
Rotunda, Leicester Square, based on 1801 drawing by Robert Mitchell

- Moor Place, Hertfordshire (1775)
- Preston Hall, Midlothian (1791)
- Rotunda, Leicester Square, London (1793)
- Old Parish Church, Peterhead (1804)
- Nelson's Column, Montreal (1809)
- Crimond Church (1812)
