= My cup runneth over =

Biblical adage

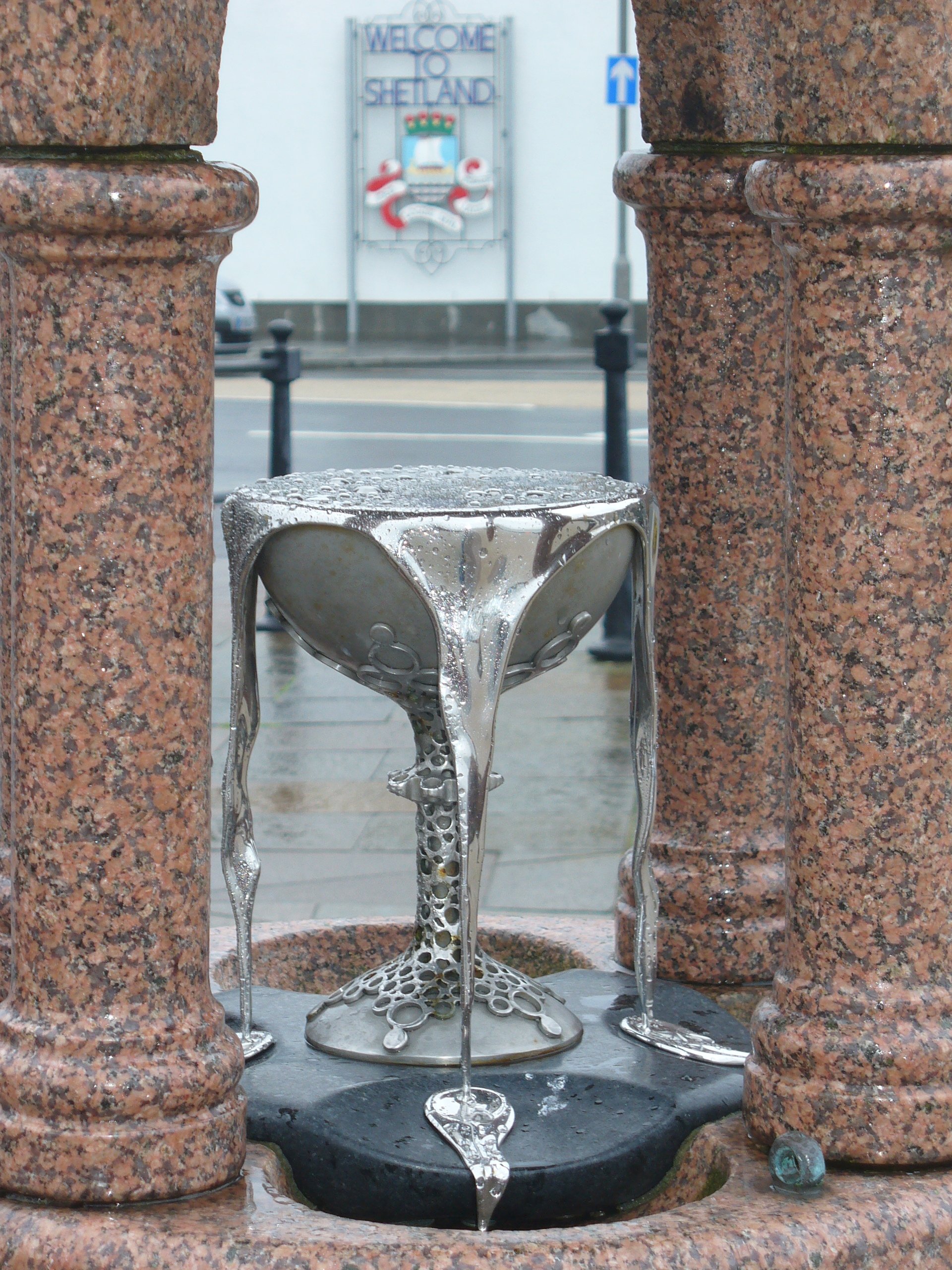
Detail of the Diana Memorial in Lerwick, Shetland Islands

"My cup runneth over" is a quotation from the Hebrew Bible (Psalm 23) and means "I have more than enough for my needs", though interpretations and usage vary.

== In the Bible ==
This phrase, in Hebrew כּוֹסִי רְוָיָה (kōsî rəwāyāh), is translated in the traditionally used King James Version as my cup runneth over. Newer translations of the phrase include "my cup overflows" and "my cup is completely full". The 23rd psalm, in which this phrase appears, uses the image of God as a shepherd and the believer as a sheep well cared-for. Julian Morgenstern has suggested that the word translated as "cup" could contain a double meaning: both a "cup" in the normal sense of the word, and a shallow trough from which one would give water to a sheep.

Other interpreters have suggested that verses 5 and 6 of Psalm 23 do not carry forward the "shepherd" metaphor begun in verse 1, but that these two verses are set in some other, entirely human, setting. Andrew Arterbury and William Bellinger read these verses as providing a metaphor of God as a host, displaying hospitality to a human being. Thus, alongside other actions in Psalm 23, such as preparing a table, and anointing one's guest with oil, providing a full or even overflowing cup for him to drink from can be read as an illustration of God's generosity to the Psalmist.
