= James Leith Macbeth Bain =

Scottish hymnwriter and minister (1860–1925)

James Leith Macbeth Bain (1860–1925) was a Scottish hymn writer, religious minister and author who became known to his peers as Brother James. He is remembered for his religious publications, as well as the hymn tune "Brother James's Air".

== Early life ==
James Leith Bain was born at his parents' house on Inverness Road, Pitlochry within the Parish of Moulin, Perthshire on 21 November 1860 to a John Bain (Colporteur) and a Margaret Leith. His parents had married on 1 November 1855 in Nairn Burgh, Nairnshire. James' siblings, also born in Pitlochry, were a John Jnr. (10 August 1856), Mary (9 October 1858), and Margaret (6 April 1863). John Bain Snr. had been born in Edinburgh Parish on 20 October 1826 to a John Bain (Shoemaker) and a Mary Campbell, while Margaret Leith had been born on 1 July 1833 at Boharm, Banffshire to an Isabella Leith.

By 1871, James Leith Bain, aged 10 years, was a scholar living with his parents and siblings at 1, Oakfield Terrace, Pitlochry. However, in the 1881 Census he is shown to be a Student of Arts living in Jane Bow's Lodging House at 5, Glen Street, Edinburgh.

According to a young friend of his youth in Oakfield Terrace, John Smeaton Smith (Vice-President of the Glasgow Orpheus Choir from 1926–51), James, before his student days in Edinburgh, had been a Pupil Teacher in a Pitlochry school, and thereafter had attended both the Edinburgh Free Church College and the Edinburgh Established Church College, with a view to becoming a Minister of Religion. He gained practical experience during this time by preaching in Argyllshire as well as Pitlochry and neighbouring Blair Athol.

== Ministry ==
James's ministry calling took him to Liverpool over the next decade, before going to London to work as a Spiritualist Minister. Indeed, there is strong evidence that this is true as he married an Elizabeth Parker of Liverpool in Paddington in 1895.

Smith recalls that it was rumoured in Pitlochry that James had been 'adopted' by a 'lady of means' and eventually had inherited her wealth, but whether that rich lady was his wife Elizabeth (Lillie), or a benefactress of his bachelor days, is not known. At any rate, the 1901 Census for 77, Warwick Road, Paddington, London indicates that the married couple were able to afford a maid and a cook.

Lillie died in 1909 in the Liverpool area, the place of her birth in 1881. James dedicated his first published work in 1909 ('The Christ of the Holy Grail') to her.

Smith also recalls the following:

"He went to London, but occasionally visited Pitlochry. His career in London was not known there in Perthshire, except that he worked among the poor. He was a nature-lover, a wanderer among woods and hills, a shade eccentric perhaps, author of a number of books, mainly religious, and added Macbeth as another middle name for these publications. I can recall only two incidents involving James and myself ..... Once when he was on his way to fish in the Tummel, he asked me to accompany him. He had not long started when his cast caught in a branch. He climbed the tree to dislodge the cast and, much to his annoyance, he accidentally broke the branch. I asked him why he was annoyed. ‘Man’, he said, ‘I’ve just lost a real good friend. Many a fine cast have I found on that self-same branch.' Later in life when I enquired of a lady who had lived next door to him in Oakfield Terrace as to whether she knew James to be musical, I was told that she did not think he played any instrument, but ‘he was aye hummin'." (Ibid.)

This last remark makes his composition of "Brother James's Air" a tune sung frequently with 'The Lord's my shepherd' and the less well known 'My Shepherd is the living God' which are both versions of (Psalm 23) all the more remarkable, but may explain the tune's beautiful simplicity.

== Bibliography ==
- Christ of the Holy Grail, 1910
- Corpus Meum: This Is My Body, 1911
- The Lady Sheila And Other Celtic Memorabilia from Stronaclachan, 1911
- The Barefoot League (London: Theosophical Publishing Company, 1914)
- The Great Peace, 1915
- Jesus-Healer, 1919
- Christ of the Healing Hand
- The Great Peace. A Mosaic of Unrhymed Song
- In the Heart of the Holy Grail
