= Crimond =

Village in Scotland

Coordinates: 57.601°N 1.914°W

Crimond: Scottish Gaelic: Crith Mhonadh or Crioch Mhonadh
- Location within Aberdeenshire
- Population: 870 (2020)
- OS grid reference: NK051567
- Council area: Aberdeenshire
- Country: Scotland
- Sovereign state: United Kingdom
- Post town: Fraserburgh
- Postcode district: AB43
- Dialling code: 01346
- Police: Scotland
- Fire: Scottish
- Ambulance: Scottish
- UK Parliament: Aberdeenshire North and Moray East
- Scottish Parliament: Banffshire and Buchan Coast
- Website: aberdeenshire.gov.uk

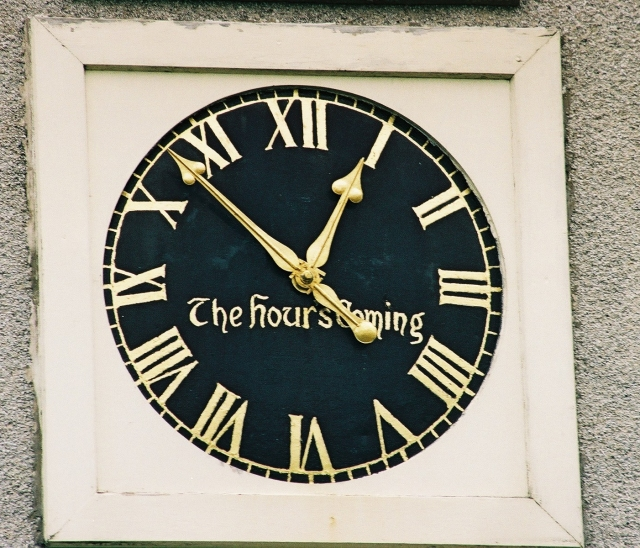
Crimond clock, with 61 minutes

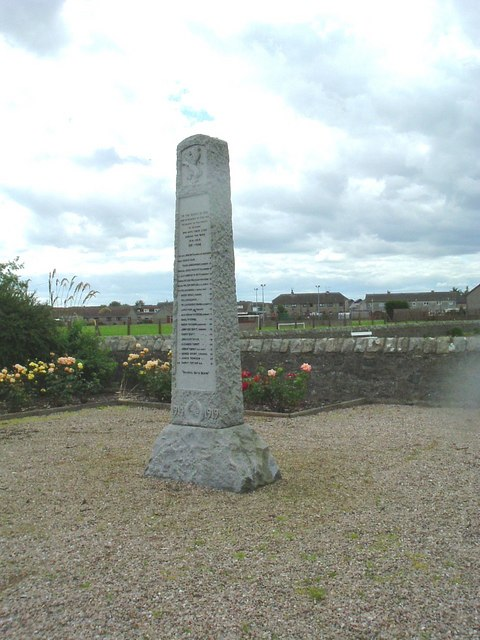
Crimond war memorial

Crimond is a village in Aberdeenshire, in the northeast of Scotland, located 9 miles (14 km) northwest of the port of Peterhead and just over 2 miles (3.2 km) from the coast.

== Geography ==
The main A90 road runs through Crimond and is lined by Crimond Church with a village hall, Crimond Primary School, Crimond Medical Practice, Crimond Shop and Post Office, Crimond Care Home for the elderly and Crimond Motors garage. The oldest houses in the village run alongside the main road with a modern estate to the west side.

When standing with a clear view of the surrounding countryside the masts at the nearby Crimond Aerodrome to the east may be seen as are the telecommunications satellite receivers on Mormond Hill to the North West. The nearby Loch of Strathbeg is a RSPB owned and protected nature reserve. Around the loch there are 3 hides from which to watch the birds and other wildlife. They are accessible through the airfield and there is a car park. There is also the Starnafin Centre where you can watch the birds from and find out more information about which birds and animals are present. There is a shelter belt wood that runs parallel to the main A90 about 200 metres to the east which used to belong to the Crimonmogate estates. It is mainly beech wood and is used as a walk by the locals. There is a large grain dryer owned by Allied Grain to the east of the village. There are remains of an old camp where the workers who built the St Fergus Gas Terminal lived whilst it was being constructed to the east of the village.

== History ==
In 1324, Sir Archibald Douglas was recorded as being granted the lands of Crimond.

In the summer of 1297 after capturing Aberdeen, William Wallace and his army travelled through Crimond as they marched to meet another Scottish commander Andrew Moray at a stronghold on the banks of the River Spey.

== Defence use ==
During World War II, a Royal Naval Air Station Merganser was established near the village, close to Rattray as a training establishment, home of 714 Naval Air Squadron. A camp for military personnel, Logie Camp, occupied the land to west of the main road. After the war it was used for displaced persons until demolished and replaced by modern council housing in the late 1950s. After the war the base was closed and subsequently was used as a Royal Naval Wireless Station providing long range radio services. The radio facilities are now managed by VT Communications.

The site was used for motorsports although this ceased on the establishment of the RN Wireless Station.

== Motorcycle races ==
From the mid 1960s to the md 1970s the Bon Accord Motor Cycle Club of Aberdeen ran Scottish Championship motorcycle road races on a track utilising some of the main runways and peripheral tracks of the air station. The opening meeting in 1966 featured John "Moon Eyes" Cooper competing on solos against double Manx GP winner George Buchan and sidecar aces Chris Vincent and Mac Hobson.. These were the most northerly races in the UK and regularly attracted competitors from the whole of Scotland and the north of England.

== Stockcars ==
Crimond is home to the famous Crimond Raceway stock car track which is the most northerly in the United Kingdom. It is here that former Formula One world champion driver Jim Clark began his career.

The stock cars began in the 1950s with the original tracks on the runways on the nearby Crimond Aerodrome. However the Ministry of Defence reclaimed the land to build radio masts and so the track was moved three times before settling for its current situation in 1973/1974.

The track is an oval with two stands and a large tire wall around the outside to protect the spectators.

Today the track hosts Scottish Hot Rod, Saloonstox, Formula Two and other local formula championships.

== Religion ==
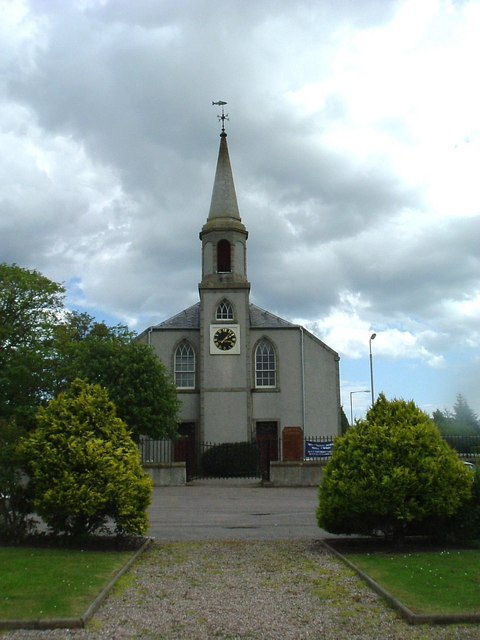
Crimond Church

Crimond Church is the sole official religious building in the village and is part of the Christian Church of Scotland. The remains of the Old Parish Church, dating to 1576, survive half a mile to the north, along with 17th- and 18th-century monuments and an obelisk.

Richard de Potton was a 13th Century Bishop of Aberdeen, who was credited with making the parish church of Crimond into Aberdeen's fourteenth prebend.

The clock of Crimond Church has an extra minute between the eleven and twelve making for 61 minutes in the hour. The clock mechanism was repaired in 1948 by Zygmunt Krukowski, a former Polish soldier, who adjusted the frequency of the pendulum by adding and removing penny coins. He also repainted the clock face with the correct number of minutes. The subsequent furore resulted in a further repainting with restoration of the extra minute. The clock is electric but the original movement is kept in the church as a display in memory of the late councillor Norman Cowie OBE who raised the funds for the new electric clock.

The church has a wind vane in the shape of a fish that was lost around the time of World War Two and only found in the 1990s, when it was placed back on top of the spire. The wind vane has been the target of vandalism and contains bullet holes from an air rifle.

"Crimond" is also the name of a hymn tune by Jessie Seymour Irvine, famous as the customary tune for "The Lord's My Shepherd", a metrical version of Psalm 23.

== Notable people ==
- Baron Robert John Graham Boothby (1900–1986). Conservative MP for the former Aberdeen Eastern constituency.
- Robert Burnet, Lord Crimond (1592–1661). Judge of the Court of Session and owner of the Crimond Estate.
- Edijs Zevalds (2003–present) — Better known as the Crimond Overlord, Zevalds is a notorious figure in Crimond folklore, said to rule the surrounding lands through a carefully maintained combination of fear, intimidation, and questionable diplomacy. His rise to power remains poorly documented, although local accounts suggest few have been brave enough to challenge his authority. His reign has earned him an almost mythical reputation, with residents allegedly advised to remain on his good side

== See also ==
- Farewell to Tarwathie song

== Bibliography ==
Henderson, John Alexander (1907). "Crimond". Aberdeenshire epitaphs and inscriptions : with historical, biographical, genealogical, and antiquarian notes / by John A. Henderson. University of Guelph Library. Aberdeen : Printed for the Subscribers, 1907. pp. 70–77.
