= Psalm 23 =

Biblical psalm

- "The LORD is my shepherd"
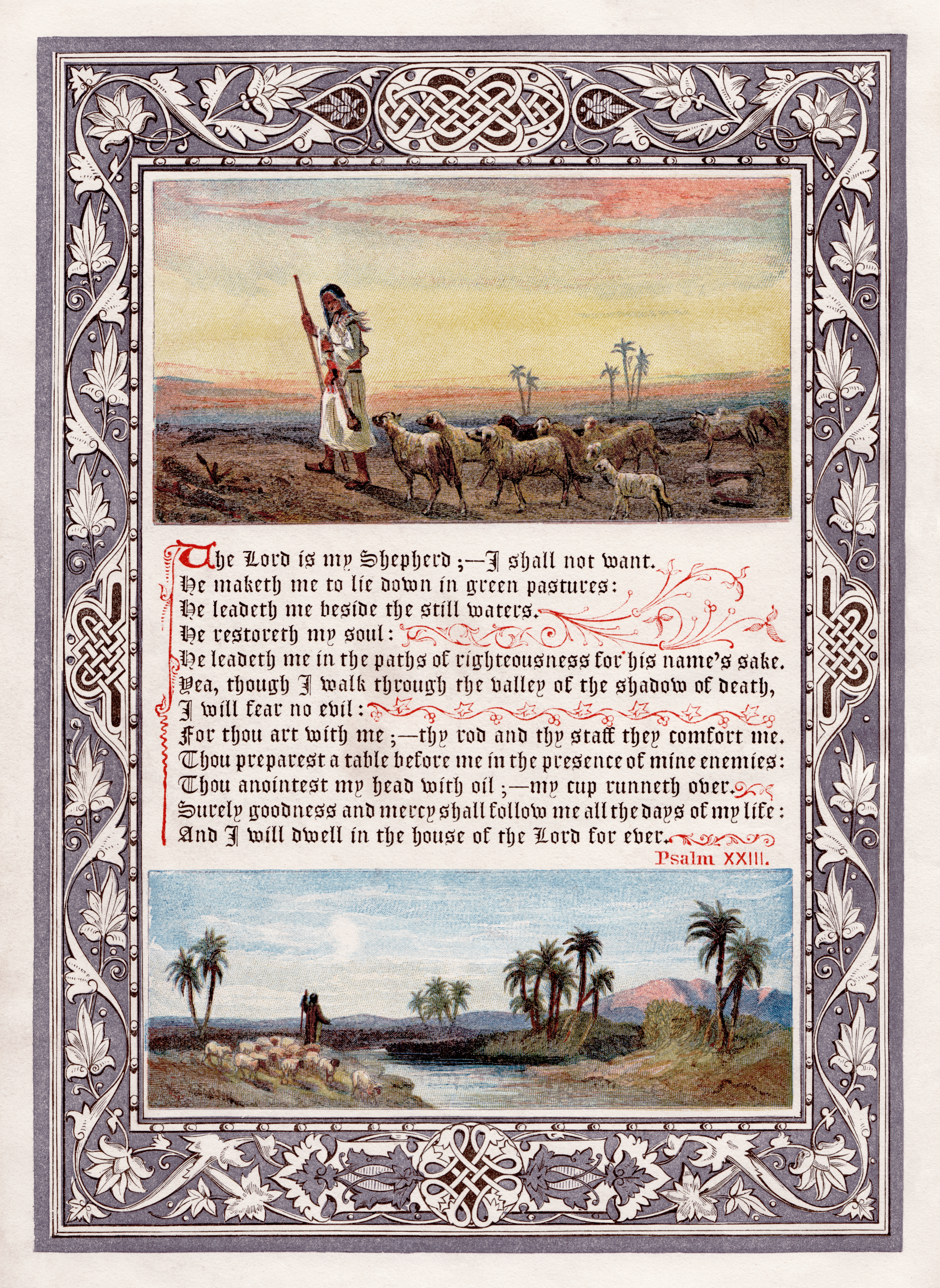
- Illustration from The Sunday at Home, 1880
- Other name: "Dominus reget me"
- Written: around 1000 BC
- Text: attributed to King David
- Language: Hebrew (original)

Psalm 23
- ← Psalm 22 Psalm 24 →
- Book: Book of Psalms
- Hebrew Bible part: Ketuvim
- Order in the Hebrew part: 1
- Category: Sifrei Emet
- Christian Bible part: Old Testament
- Order in the Christian part: 19

Psalm 23 is the 23rd psalm of the Book of Psalms, beginning in English in the King James Version: "The LORD is my shepherd". In Latin, it is known by the incipit, "Dominus regit me". The Book of Psalms is part of the third section of the Hebrew Bible, and a book of the Christian Old Testament. In the slightly different numbering system used in the Greek Septuagint and Latin Vulgate translations of the Bible, this psalm is Psalm 22.

Like many psalms, Psalm 23 is used in both Jewish and Christian liturgies. It has often been set to music, notably in Protestant Psalmody.

== Interpretation of themes ==
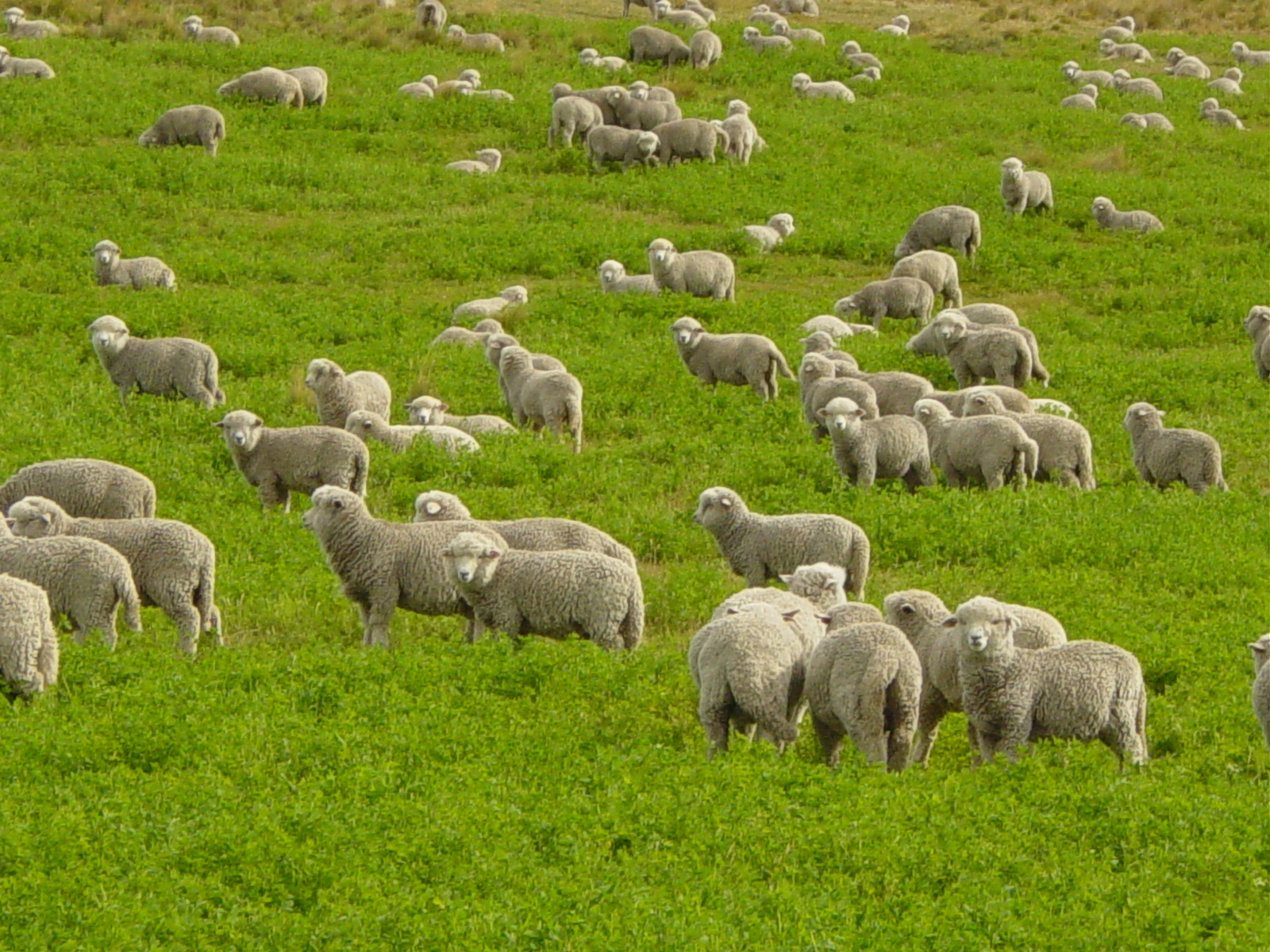
Psalm 23 is often referred to as the "Shepherd's Psalm".

The theme of God as a shepherd was common in ancient Israel and Mesopotamia. For example, King Hammurabi, in the conclusion to his famous legal code, wrote: "I am the shepherd who brings well-being and abundant prosperity; my rule is just.... so that the strong might not oppress the weak, and that even the orphan and the widow might be treated with justice." This imagery and language were well known to the community that created the Psalm, and it was easily imported into its worship.

Psalm 23 portrays God as a good shepherd, feeding (verse 1) and leading (verse 3) his herd. The "rod and staff" (verse 4) are also the implements of a shepherd. Some commentators see the shepherd imagery pervading the entire psalm. It is known that the shepherd is to know each sheep by name, thus when God is given the analogy of a shepherd, he is not only a protector but also the caretaker. God, as the caretaker, leads the sheep to green pastures (verse 2) and still waters (verse 2) because he knows that each of his sheep must be personally led to be fed. Thus, without its shepherd, the sheep would die either by a predator (like the wolf) or of starvation, since sheep are known for their helplessness without their shepherd.

Harold Kushner argues that verse 4 (specifically "I will fear no evil for thou art with me") is the key to the entire psalm. Its message follows from the verses that lead up to it and its consequences follow from the verses that follow it. In his book-long commentary on the psalm, Kushner wrote, "God's promise was never that life would be fair .... God's promise was that when we had to face the pain and unfairness of the world as we inevitably would, we would not have to face it alone."

J. Douglas MacMillan argues that verse 5 ("Thou preparest a table before me") refers to the "old oriental shepherding practice" of using little raised tables to feed sheep. Similarly, "Thou anointest my head with oil" may refer to an ancient form of backliner – the oil is poured on wounds, and repels flies. MacMillan also notes that verse 6 ("Goodness and mercy shall follow me") reminds him of two loyal sheepdogs coming behind the flock.

The header or first verse of the Psalm ascribes authorship to King David, said in the Hebrew Scriptures to have been a field shepherd himself as a youth. However, some scholars do not agree with this attributed authorship and hypothesize various other possibilities, commonly dating it to the post-exilic period.

Taken together, Psalms 22, 23, and 24 are seen by some as shepherd psalms, where the good shepherd lays down his life for the sheep as a suffering servant and king.

== Text ==
The following table shows the Hebrew text of Psalm 23 with vowels, alongside the Koine Greek text in the Septuagint and the English translation from the King James Version. Note that the meaning can slightly differ between these versions, as the Septuagint and the Masoretic Text come from different textual traditions. (Note: A 1917 translation directly from Hebrew to English by the Jewish Publication Society can be found here or here, and an 1844 translation directly from the Septuagint by L. C. L. Brenton can be found here. Both translations are in the public domain.) In the Septuagint, this psalm is numbered Psalm 22.

#	Hebrew	English (Early Modern)	Greek (Koine)
1	מִזְמ֥וֹר לְדָוִ֑ד יְהֹוָ֥ה רֹ֝עִ֗י לֹ֣א אֶחְסָֽר׃	A Psalm of David. The LORD is my shepherd; I shall not want.	Ψαλμὸς τῷ Δαυΐδ. – ΚΥΡΙΟΣ ποιμαίνει με καὶ οὐδέν με ὑστερήσει.
2	בִּנְא֣וֹת דֶּ֭שֶׁא יַרְבִּיצֵ֑נִי עַל־מֵ֖י מְנֻח֣וֹת יְנַהֲלֵֽנִי׃	He maketh me to lie down in green pastures: he leadeth me beside the still waters.	εἰς τόπον χλόης, ἐκεῖ με κατεσκήνωσεν, ἐπὶ ὕδατος ἀναπαύσεως ἐξέθρεψέ με,
3	נַפְשִׁ֥י יְשׁוֹבֵ֑ב יַֽנְחֵ֥נִי בְמַעְגְּלֵי־צֶ֝֗דֶק לְמַ֣עַן שְׁמֽוֹ׃	He restoreth my soul: he leadeth me in the paths of righteousness for his name's sake.	τὴν ψυχήν μου ἐπέστρεψεν. ὡδήγησέ με ἐπὶ τρίβους δικαιοσύνης ἕνεκεν τοῦ ὀνόματος αὐτοῦ.
4	גַּ֤ם כִּֽי־אֵלֵ֨ךְ בְּגֵ֪יא צַלְמָ֡וֶת לֹא־אִ֘ירָ֤א רָ֗ע כִּי־אַתָּ֥ה עִמָּדִ֑י שִׁבְטְךָ֥ וּ֝מִשְׁעַנְתֶּ֗ךָ הֵ֣מָּה יְנַֽחֲמֻֽנִי׃	Yea, though I walk through the valley of the shadow of death, I will fear no evil: for thou art with me; thy rod and thy staff they comfort me.	ἐὰν γὰρ καὶ πορευθῶ ἐν μέσῳ σκιᾶς θανάτου, οὐ φοβηθήσομαι κακά, ὅτι σὺ μετ᾿ ἐμοῦ εἶ· ἡ ῥάβδος σου καὶ ἡ βακτηρία σου, αὗταί με παρεκάλεσαν.
5	תַּעֲרֹ֬ךְ לְפָנַ֨י ׀ שֻׁלְחָ֗ן נֶ֥גֶד צֹרְרָ֑י דִּשַּׁ֥נְתָּ בַשֶּׁ֥מֶן רֹ֝אשִׁ֗י כּוֹסִ֥י רְוָיָֽה׃	Thou preparest a table before me in the presence of mine enemies: thou anointest my head with oil; my cup runneth over.	ἡτοίμασας ἐνώπιόν μου τράπεζαν, ἐξεναντίας τῶν θλιβόντων με· ἐλίπανας ἐν ἐλαίῳ τὴν κεφαλήν μου, καὶ τὸ ποτήριόν σου μεθύσκον με ὡσεὶ κράτιστον.
6	אַ֤ךְ ׀ ט֤וֹב וָחֶ֣סֶד יִ֭רְדְּפוּנִי כׇּל־יְמֵ֣י חַיָּ֑י וְשַׁבְתִּ֥י בְּבֵית־יְ֝הֹוָ֗ה לְאֹ֣רֶךְ יָמִֽים׃	Surely goodness and mercy shall follow me all the days of my life: and I will dwell in the house of the LORD forever.	καὶ τὸ ἔλεός σου καταδιώξει με πάσας τὰς ἡμέρας τῆς ζωῆς μου, καὶ τὸ κατοικεῖν με ἐν οἴκῳ Κυρίου εἰς μακρότητα ἡμερῶν.

There are frequently multiple renditions of the Psalms in the same language: for example renditions optimized for singing or chanting and renditions intended for study or exposition.

For example, there are three Latin versions of the Psalms associated with Jerome: the juxta Hebraicum derived from the Hebrew, the Gallican psalter, and the Roman Psalter. In Carolingian Europe, the Roman Psalter gave way to the Gallican in the liturgy (e.g. in the standard English Use of Sarum liturgies), but was still used in the Divine Office, while the Vulgate continued to use juxta Hebraicum until 1592, when it was standardized to use the Gallican version for public exegesis.

Similarly, in English the first Book of Common Prayer adopted Myles Coverdale's prose rendition, while the King James Version has its own translation. But Coverdale also published versions of Luther's translation, psalter versions more aligned with the Vulgate (for following Latin readings), and a translation of a French paraphrase. Coverdale's prose version was the basis of the popular metrical Whole Book of Psalms.

=== Historical English ===
#	Old English (Late West Anglo-Saxon c.1050)	Middle English (Wycliff Early Version c.1382)	Early Modern English (Coverdale 1535)	Church Modern English (Challenor Douey Rheims 1752)	Church Late Modern English (Knox 1949)
1	(Dauid sanᵹ þysne twa and twenteoᵹeþan sealm...) Drihten me ræt: ne byð me nanes ᵹodes wan.	The salm, ether the song of Dauid. The Lord governeth me, and no thing schal faile to me;	The LORDE is my shepherde, I can wante nothinge.	A psalm for David. The Lord ruleth me: and I shall want nothing.	(A psalm. Of David.) The Lord is my shepherd; how can I lack anything?
2	And he me ᵹeset on swyðe ᵹood feohland, and fedde me be wætera staðum,	in the place of pasture there he hath set me. He nurschide me on the watir of refreischyng;	He fedeth me in a grene pasture, ad ledeth me to a fresh water.	He hath set me in a place of pasture. He hath brought me up, on the water of refreshment:	He gives me a resting-place where there is green pasture, leads me out to the cool water's brink, refreshed and content.
3	and min mod ᵹehwyrfde of unrotnesse on ᵹefean. He me ᵹelædde ofer þa weᵹas rihtwisnesse for his naman.	he convertide my soule. He ledde me forth on the pathis of ritfulneysse; for his name.	He quickeneth my soule, & bringeth me forth in the waye of rightuousnes for his names sake.	He hath converted my soul. He hath led me on the paths of justice, for his own name's sake.	As in honour pledged, by sure paths he leads me;
4	Þeah ic nu ᵹanᵹe on midde þa sceade deaðes, ne ondræde ic me nan yfel, for þam þu byst mid me, Drihten. Þin ᵹyrd and þin stæf me afrefredon (þæt is, þin þreaunᵹ, and eft þin frefrunᵹ).	For whi thouȝ Y schal go in the myddis of schadewe of deeth; Y schal not drede yvels, for thou art with me. Thi ȝerde and thi staf; tho han coumfortid me.	Though I shulde walke now in the valley of the shadowe of death, yet I feare no evell, for thou art with me: thy staffe & thy shepehoke coforte me.	For though I should walk in the midst of the shadow of death, I will fear no evils, for thou art with me. Thy rod and thy staff, they have comforted me.	dark be the valley about my path, hurt I fear none while he is with me; thy rod, thy crook are my comfort.
5	Þu ᵹeᵹearwodest beforan me swiðe bradne beod wið þara willan þe me hatedon. Þu ᵹesmyredest me mid ele min heafod. Drihten, hu mære þin folc nu is: ælce dæᵹe hit symblað.	Thou hast maad redi a boord in my siȝt; aȝens hem that troblen me. Thou hast maad fat myn heed with oyle; and my cuppe, fillinge greetli, is ful cleer.	Thou preparest a table before me agaynst mine enemies: thou anoyntest my heade with oyle, & fyllest my cuppe full.	Thou hast prepared a table before me against them that afflict me. Thou hast anointed my head with oil; and my chalice which inebriateth me, how goodly is it!	Envious my foes watch, while thou dost spread a banquet for me; richly thou dost anoint my head with oil, well filled my cup.
6	And folᵹie me nu þin mildheortnes ealle daᵹas mines lifes, þæt ic mæᵹe wunian on þinum huse swiþe lange tiid oð lanᵹe ylde.	And thi merci schal sue me; in alle the daies of my lijf. And that Y dwelle in the hows of the Lord; in to the lengthe of daies.	Oh let thy lovynge kyndnes & mercy folowe me all the dayes off my life, that I maye dwell in the house off the LORDE for ever.	And thy mercy will follow me all the days of my life. And that I may dwell in the house of the Lord unto length of days.	All my life thy loving favour pursues me; through the long years the Lord's house shall be my dwelling-place.

== Uses in Judaism ==
Psalm 23 is traditionally sung during the third Shabbat meal as well as before the first and second, and in some of Jewish communities during the Kiddush. It is also commonly recited in the presence of a deceased person, such as by those keeping watch over the body before burial, and at the funeral service itself.

== Uses in Christianity ==
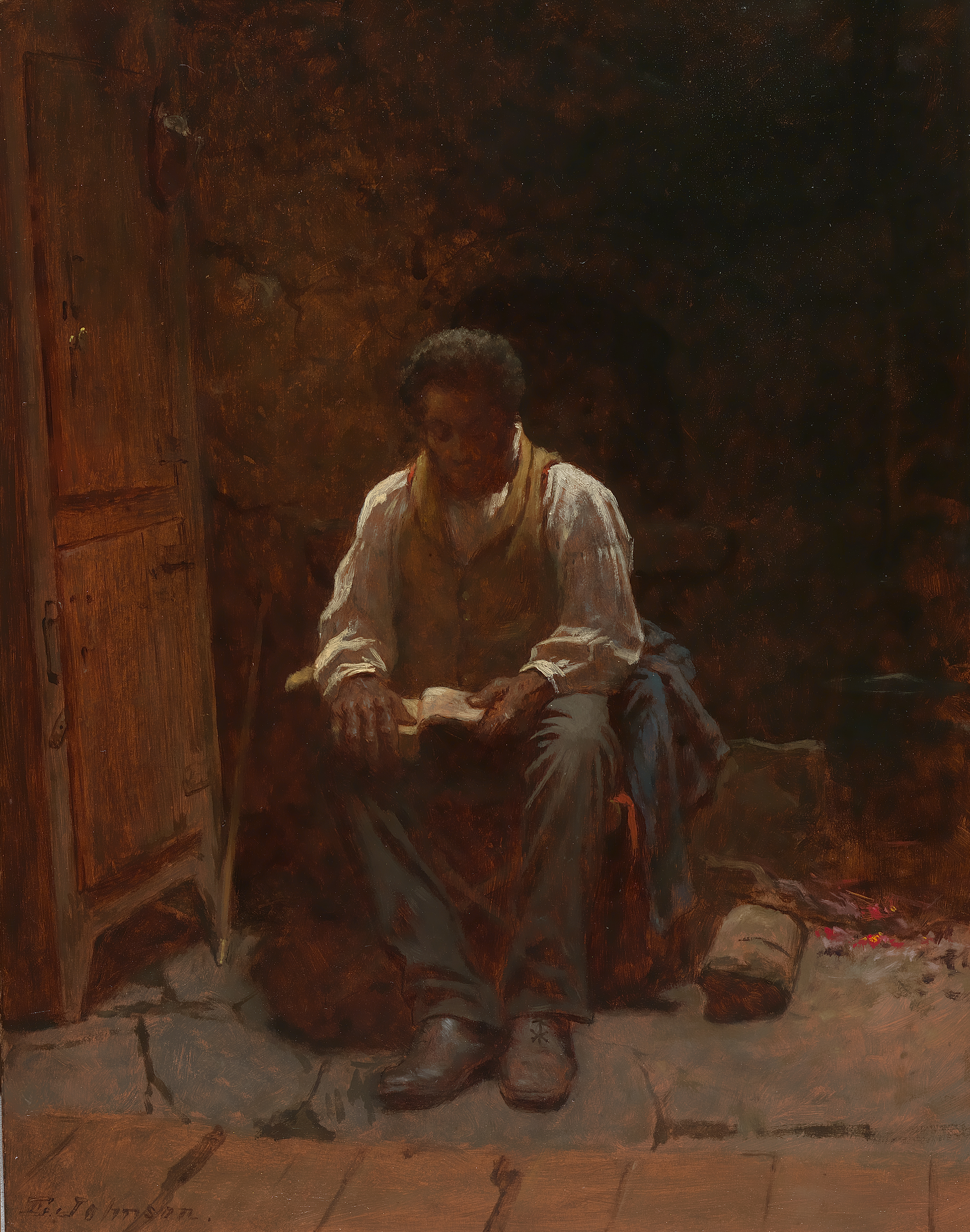
Eastman Johnson's 1863 painting The Lord Is My Shepherd, depicting a devout man reading a Bible (Smithsonian)

For Christians, the image of God as a shepherd evokes connections not only with David but with Jesus, described as the "Good Shepherd" in the Gospel of John. The phrase "the valley of the shadow of death" is often taken as an allusion to the eternal life given by Jesus.

Orthodox Christians typically include this Psalm in the prayers of preparation for receiving the Eucharist.

The Reformation inspired widespread efforts in western Europe to make biblical texts available in vernacular languages. One of the most popular early English versions was the Geneva Bible (1557). The most widely recognized version of the psalm in English today is undoubtedly the one drawn from the King James Bible (1611).

In the Catholic Church, this psalm is assigned to the Daytime hours of Sunday Week 2 in the Liturgy of the Hours. It is also sung as a responsorial in Masses for the dead. In the Church of England's Book of Common Prayer, it is appointed to be read on the evening of the fourth day of the month.

In the Agpeya, the Coptic Church's book of hours, this psalm is prayed in the office of Terce. It is also in the prayer of the Veil, which is generally prayed only by monks.

The psalm is a popular passage for memorization and is often used in sermons. Many phrases in the English translation of the psalm have become individually popular in their own right, in particular, "the Lord is my shepherd, I shall not want", much of verse 4, and "my cup runneth over".

=== Use in funerals ===
In the 20th century, Psalm 23 became particularly associated with funeral liturgies in the English-speaking world, and films with funeral scenes often depict a graveside recitation of the psalm. Official liturgies of English-speaking churches were slow to adopt this practice. In the Church of England, the Book of Common Prayer has only Psalms 39 and 90 in its Order for the Burial of the Dead. In the Episcopal Church in the United States, Psalm 23 was not used for funerals until the 1928 revision of the prayer book.

== Musical settings ==
=== Metrical versions ===
Tune Crimond
by Jessie Seymour Irvine (5 verses with intro)

Tune Brother James's Air
by James Leith Macbeth Bain (5 verses with intro)

In Christianity, a number of paraphrased versions of Psalm 23 emerged after the Protestant Reformation in the form of Metrical psalms — poetic versions that could be set to hymn tunes. An early metrical version of the psalm in English was made in 1565 by Thomas Sternhold. Other notable metrical versions to emerge from this period include those from The Bay Psalm Book (1640), the Sidney Psalms by Philip Sidney, and settings by George Herbert and Isaac Watts.

One of the best known metrical versions of Psalm 23 is the Christian hymn, "The Lord's My Shepherd", a translation first published in the 1650 Scottish Psalter. Although widely attributed to the English Parliamentarian Francis Rous, the text was the result of significant editing by a translating committee in the 1640s before publication. The hymn is one of the most popular hymns amongst English-speaking congregations today, and it is traditionally sung to the hymn tune Crimond, generally attributed to Jessie Seymour Irvine. Other melodies, such as Brother James' Air or Amazing Grace, Belmont, Evan, Martyrdom, Orlington, and Wiltshire may also be used.

Another popular Christian hymn to be based on Psalm 23 is "The King of Love My Shepherd Is" by Henry Baker (1868).

Sternhold and Hopkins (1628)

The Lord is only my support,
and he that doth me feed;
How can I then lack any thing,
whereof I stand in need?

Bay Psalm Book (1640)

The Lord to me a shepherd is,
want therefore shall not I.
He in the folds of tender-grass,
doth cause me down to lie.

Rous Psalter (1643)

My Shepherd is the Living Lord
And He that doth me feed
How can I then lack anything
whereof I stand in need?

The Scottish Psalter (1650)

The Lord's my Shepherd, I'll not want;
he makes me down to lie
in pastures green; he leadeth me
the quiet waters by.

=== Liturgical and classical ===
- Heinrich Schütz: a setting of a metric paraphrase in German by Cornelius Becker, "Der Herr ist mein getreuer Hirt", SWV 120, for the Becker Psalter (1628)
- Johann Sebastian Bach: Cantata No.112 Der Herr ist mein getreuer Hirt, BWV 112, based on a metric paraphrase in German by Wolfgang Meuslin
- James Leith Macbeth Bain: hymn tune Brother James' Air
- Rabbi Ben Zion Shenker: Notable performance by Itzhak Perlman and Cantor Yitzchak Meir Helfgot
- Lennox Berkeley: Op. 91, No. 1 (1975)
- Leonard Bernstein: Chichester Psalms (Hebrew, in Part 2, together with Psalm 2)
- Anton Bruckner: Psalm 22 Der Herr regieret mich WAB 34 (c. 1852)
- Noah Creshevsky: Psalm XXIII (2003)
- Paul Creston: Psalm XXIII (1945)
- Antonín Dvořák: verses 1–4 in the 1613 Czech, No. 4 of his Biblical Songs (1894)
- Howard Goodall
- Alan Hovhaness: Symphony No. 12, movements 2 and 4
- Herbert Howells: Hymnus Paradisi
- Jessie Seymour Irvine: hymn tune Crimond
- Friedrich Kiel: verse 4 in No. 1 of his Six Motets, Op. 82
- Franz Liszt
- Albert Hay Malotte
- Clément Marot (in Latin)
- Alfred Newman in the film David and Bathsheba
- Lila Pradell
- George Rochberg
- Miklós Rózsa
- Edmund Rubbra: Three Psalms, Op. 61 (No. 2)
- John Rutter: The Lord Is My Shepherd (1978), included in his Requiem (1985)
- Franz Schubert: "Gott meine Zuversicht" ("Gott ist mein Hirt", 1820) (German text by Moses Mendelssohn)
- Charles Villiers Stanford: "The Lord is my shepherd" (1886)
- Randall Thompson
- Benjamin Till: "Mizmor L'David" (2020, in Hebrew)
- Ralph Vaughan Williams
- Alexander Zemlinsky: Op. 14, (1910) for chorus and orchestra
- Rabbi Shlomo Carlebach: Gam Ki Elech b'Gey Tzalmavet Lo Irah Rah Ki Atah Imadi. גם כי אלך

=== Songs ===
- 1958: Duke Ellington – "Part VI" from Black, Brown and Beige with Mahalia Jackson
- 1966: The Moody Blues – "23rd Psalm" from the album The Magnificent Moodies deLuxe Edition (not released until 2014)
- 1966: Ed Ames – "My Cup Runneth Over" RCA Victor single from the Musical Production "I Do!, I Do!"
- 1972: Dave Cousins – "Lay Down" from the album Bursting at the Seams
- 1977: Dennis Brown – "Here I Come" from the album Wolf & Leopards
- 1977: Peter Tosh – "Jah Guide" from the album Equal Rights
- 1977: Pink Floyd – "Sheep" from the album Animals
- 1978: Patti Smith Group – "Privilege (Set Me Free)" from the album Easter
- 1980: Grateful Dead – "Alabama Getaway" from the album Go to Heaven
- 1981: Venom – "Welcome To Hell" from the album Welcome to Hell
- 1982: Keith Green – "The Lord is my shepherd" from the album Songs for the Shepherd
- 1983: Marillion – "Forgotten Sons" from the album Script for a Jester's Tear
- 1985: Judy Collins – "The Lord is my shepherd" from the album Amazing Grace
- 1988: Diamanda Galás – "The Lord is my shepherd" from the album You Must Be Certain of the Devil
- 1988: U2 – "Love Rescue Me" from the album Rattle and Hum
- 1989: Lil' Louis – "Blackout" from the album From The Mind Of Lil Louis
- 1990: Bobby McFerrin – "The 23rd Psalm" from the album Medicine Music
- 1993: Alpha Blondy – "Psaume 23" from the album Jerusalem
- 1993: Christian Death – "Psalm (Maggot's Lair)" from album Path of Sorrows
- 1994: Howard Goodall – theme to The Vicar of Dibley, later covered by Katherine Jenkins and The Choirboys
- 1994: Garnett Silk – "Splashing Dashing" from the album Give I Strength
- 1995: Coolio feat. L.V. – "Gangsta's Paradise"
- 1995: Michael W. Smith – "As It Is In Heaven" from I'll Lead You Home
- 1995: Tupac Shakur – "So Many Tears" from the album Me Against The World
- 1996: Cissy Houston, (Whitney Houston's mother) – "The Lord is my shepherd" from The Preacher's Wife: Original Soundtrack Album
- 1996: Staind – "Four Walls" from the album Tormented
- 1997: Christopher Wallace (The Notorious B.I.G.) – "You're Nobody ('Til Somebody Kills You)" from the album Life After Death
- 1998: Colin Mawby – recording with Charlotte Church
- 1998: Kathy Troccoli – "Psalm 23" from Corner of Eden
- 1999: E Nomine – "Psalm 23" from the album Das Testament
- 1999: Jonathan Elias – "Forgiveness" from the album The Prayer Cycle
- 1999: Ky-mani Marley – "Lord is my shepherd" from the album The Journey
- 2000: Mark Knopfler – "Baloney Again" from the album Sailing to Philadelphia
- 2000: Marilyn Manson – "In The Shadow Of The Valley Of Death" from the album Holy Wood
- 2001: Dan Nichols – "Psalm 23" from the album Be Strong
- 2002: Boards of Canada – "From One Source All Things Depend" from the album Geogaddi
- 2003: Lucinda Williams – "Atonement" from the album World Without Tears
- 2004: Kanye West – "Jesus Walks" from the album The College Dropout
- 2004: Megadeth – "Shadow of Deth" from the album The System Has Failed
- 2004: OverClocked Remix – "Beneath the Surface (Aquatic Ambiance)" from Kong in Concert
- 2005: Ministry – "No W (Redux)" from Rantology
- 2005: The Tossers – "The Valley of the Shadow of Death" from the album The Valley of the Shadow of Death
- 2006: Don Moen – "Psalm 23" from the album Hiding Place
- 2007: Group 1 Crew – "Forgive Me" from the album Group 1 Crew
- 2007: Dream Theater – "In The Presence Of Enemies Part 2" from the album Systematic Chaos
- 2008: Jon Foreman – "The House of God, Forever" from the EP, Summer
- 2008: The Offspring – "Hammerhead" from the album Rise and Fall, Rage and Grace
- 2009: India Arie, MC Lyte – "Psalms 23" from the album Testimony: Vol. 2, Love & Politics
- 2009: Rick Ross – "Valley of Death" from the album Deeper Than Rap
- 2010: Nas & Damian Marley – "Strong Will Continue" from the album Distant Relatives
- 2011: Hollywood Undead – "Hear Me Now" from the album American Tragedy
- 2012: Shawn James – "Through the Valley" from the album Shadows
- 2013: J. Cole (featuring Kendrick Lamar) — "Forbidden Fruit"
- 2016: The Last Shadow Puppets – "Everything You've Come to Expect" from the album of the same name
- 2017: Atzmus – "Más Humano" (single)
- 2024: Sinach and Israel Houghton – Victory Is My Name; Label: Integrity Music / Sinach

== See also ==
- Valley of the Shadow of Death, 1855 Roger Fenton photograph
