= Glass etching =

Decorating glass by etching

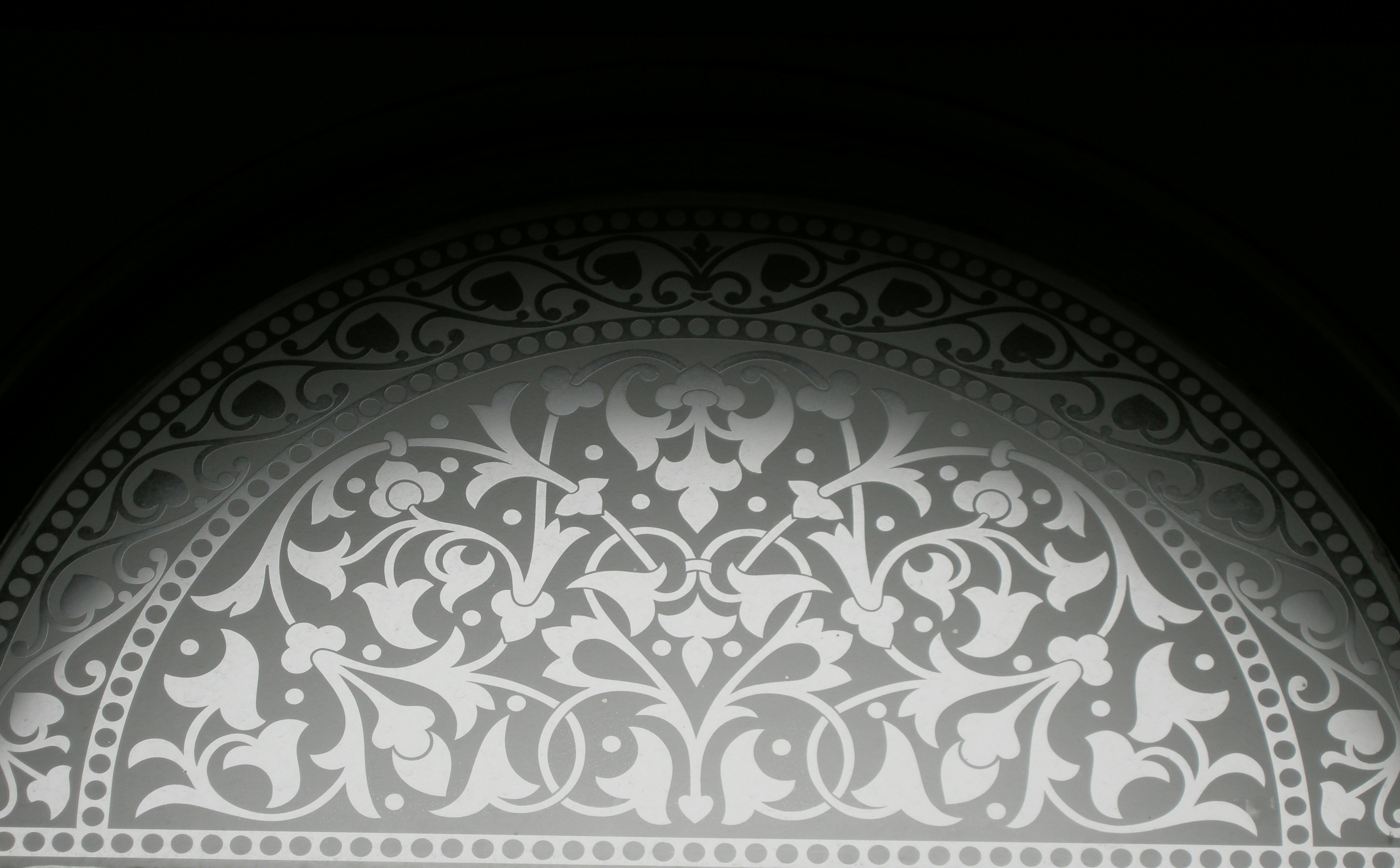
186 etched glass at Bankfield Museum

Glass etching, or "French embossing", is a popular technique developed during the mid-1800s that is still widely used in both residential and commercial spaces today. Glass etching comprises the techniques of creating art on the surface of glass by applying acidic, caustic, or abrasive substances. Traditionally this is done after the glass is blown or cast, although mold-etching has replaced some forms of surface etching. The removal of minute amounts of glass causes the characteristic rough surface and translucent quality of frosted glass.

== Techniques ==
Various techniques are used to achieve an etched surface in glass, whether for artistic effect, or simply to create a translucent surface.

Acid etching is done using hexafluorosilicic acid (H_{2}SiF_{6}) which, when anhydrous, is colourless. The acid can be prepared by mixing quartz powder (silicon dioxide), calcium fluoride, and concentrated sulfuric acid; the acid forms after the resulting mixture is heated and the fumes (silicon tetrafluoride) have been absorbed by concentrated sulfuric acid.

Glass etching cream is used by hobbyists as it is generally easier to use than acid. Available from art supply stores, it consists of fluoride compounds, such as hydrogen fluoride and sodium fluoride. As the types of acids used in this process are extremely hazardous (see hydrofluoric acid for safety), abrasive methods have gained popularity.

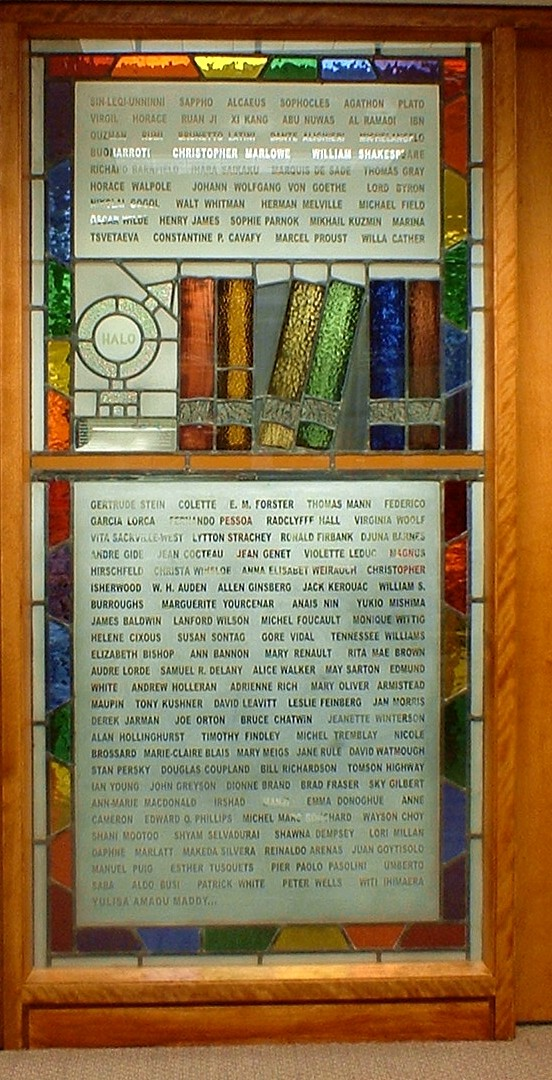
Etched glass and stained glass commemorative window (c. 2006)

Abrasive blasting ("sandblasting") is another common technique for creating patterns in glassware, creating a "frosted" look to the glass. It is often used commercially. High-pressure air mixed with an abrasive material cuts away at the glass surface to create the desired effect. The longer the stream of air and abrasive material are focused in one spot, the deeper the cut.

Leptat glass is a glass that has been etched using a patented acid process. Leptat takes its name from the Czech word meaning 'to etch', because the technique was inspired by a Czech (former Czechoslovak) glass exhibit viewed at a past World's Fair in Osaka, Japan, and patented in the United States by Bernard E. Gruenke, Jr. of the Conrad Schmitt Studios. Abstract, figural, contemporary, and traditional designs have been executed in Leptat glass. A secondary design or pattern is sometimes etched more lightly into the negative areas, for further interest. Gold leaf or colored enamels also can be inlaid to highlight the designs. The Leptat technique allows the glass to reflect light from many surfaces, like a jewel-cut gem.

Mold etching In the 1920s a mold-etch process was invented, in which art was etched directly into the mold, so that each cast piece emerged from the mold with the texture already on the surface of the glass. This reduced manufacturing costs and, combined with a wider use of colored glass, led to cheap glassware in the 1930s, which later became known as Depression glass.

Frost etching is the process in which vinyl window material is cut to produce a pattern and then applied to a window to give a frosted patterned effect.

== Applications ==
There are many interior and exterior applications for acid-etched glass. Acid-etched glass is widely used for:

- Enhancing every area where glass can be used and where a little privacy and natural light is desired
- Creating feature walls or partitions.
- Enriching doors and windows
- Heightening the look of balustrades
- Augmenting shower and bath enclosures

== Examples ==
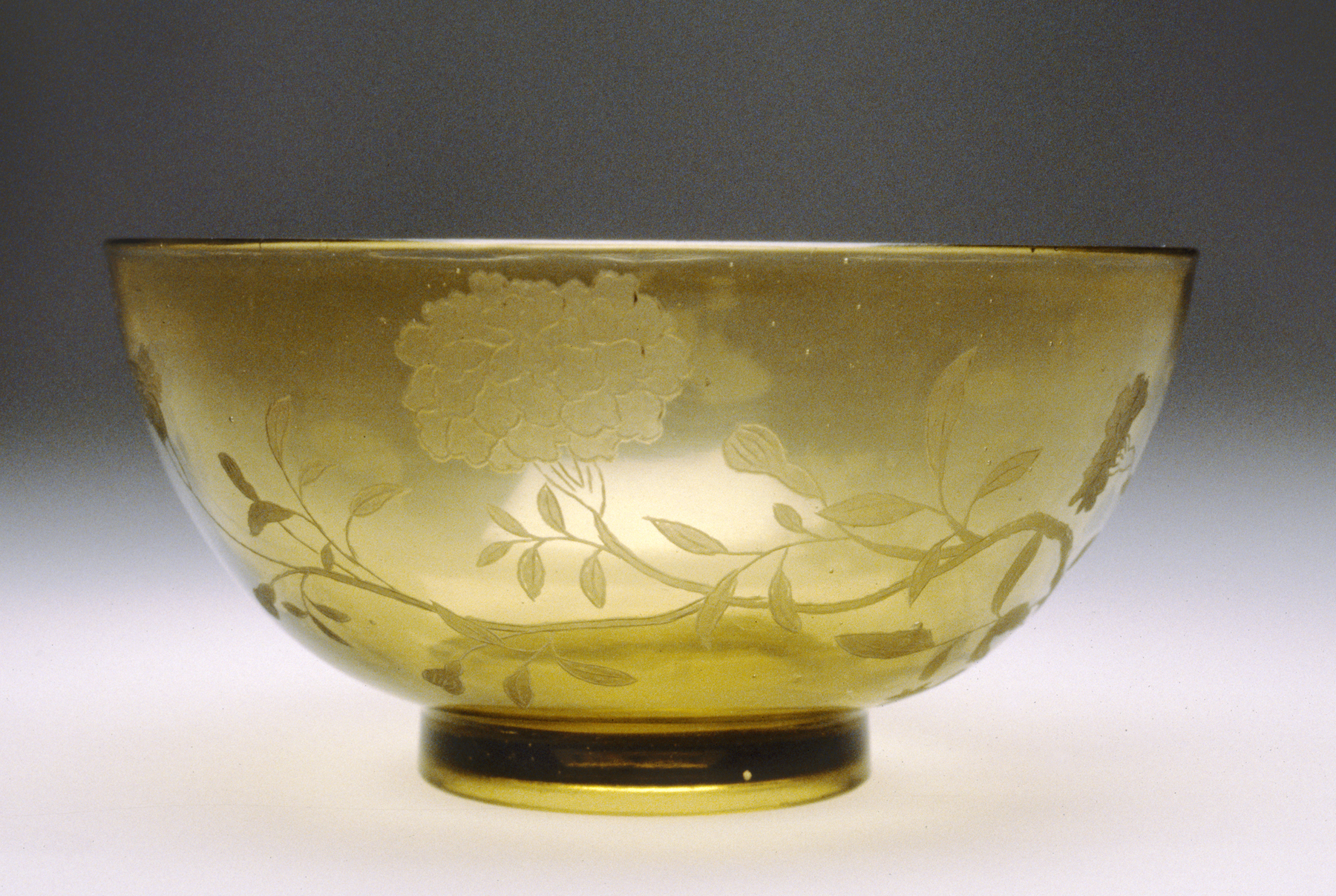
Eighteenth century Chinese bowl, wheel cut (engraved) and etched

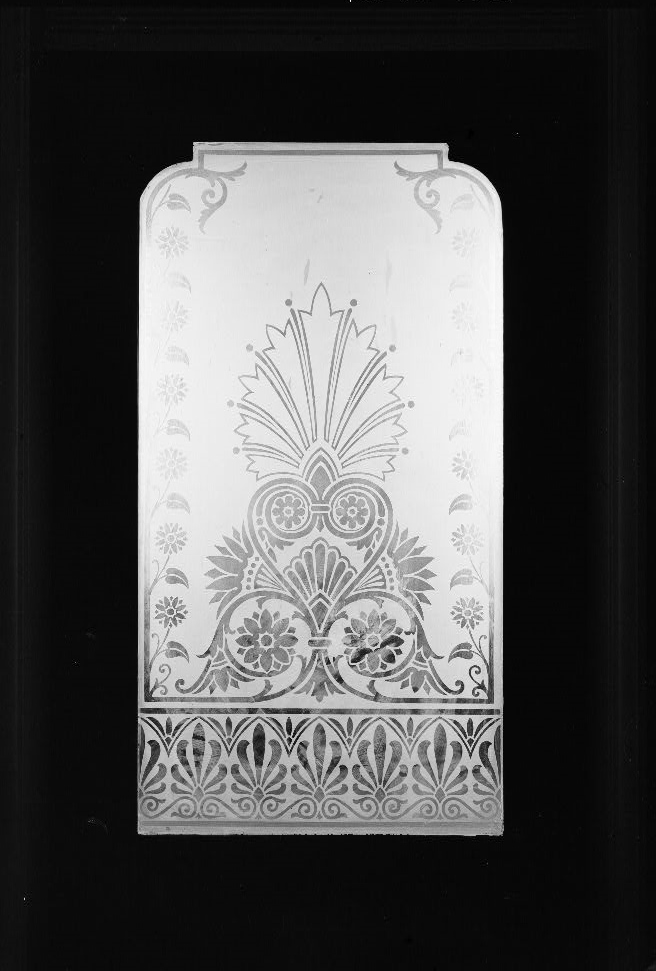
Etched door window (American, nineteenth century)

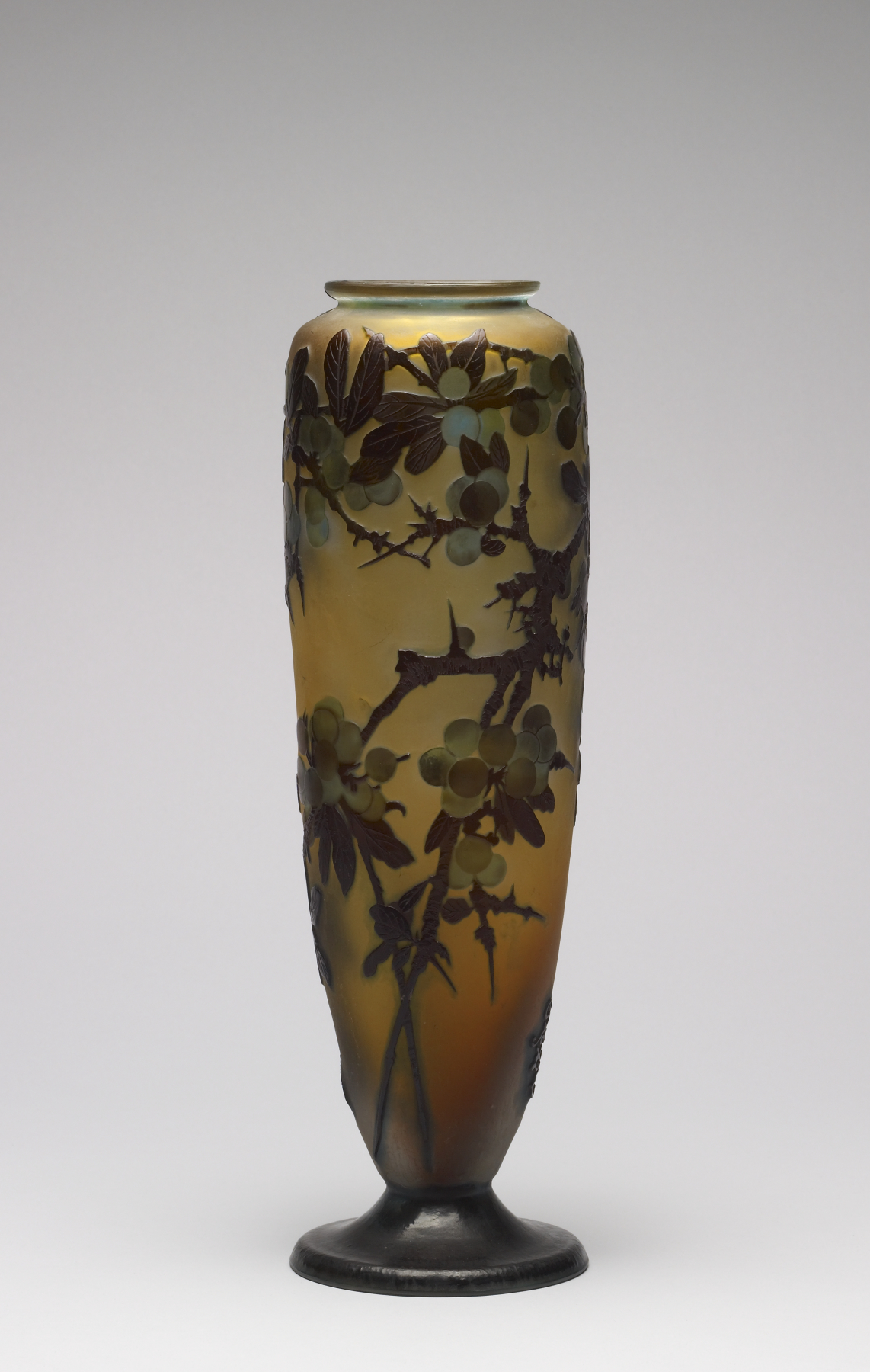
Acid-etched vase by Emile Gallé (twentieth century)

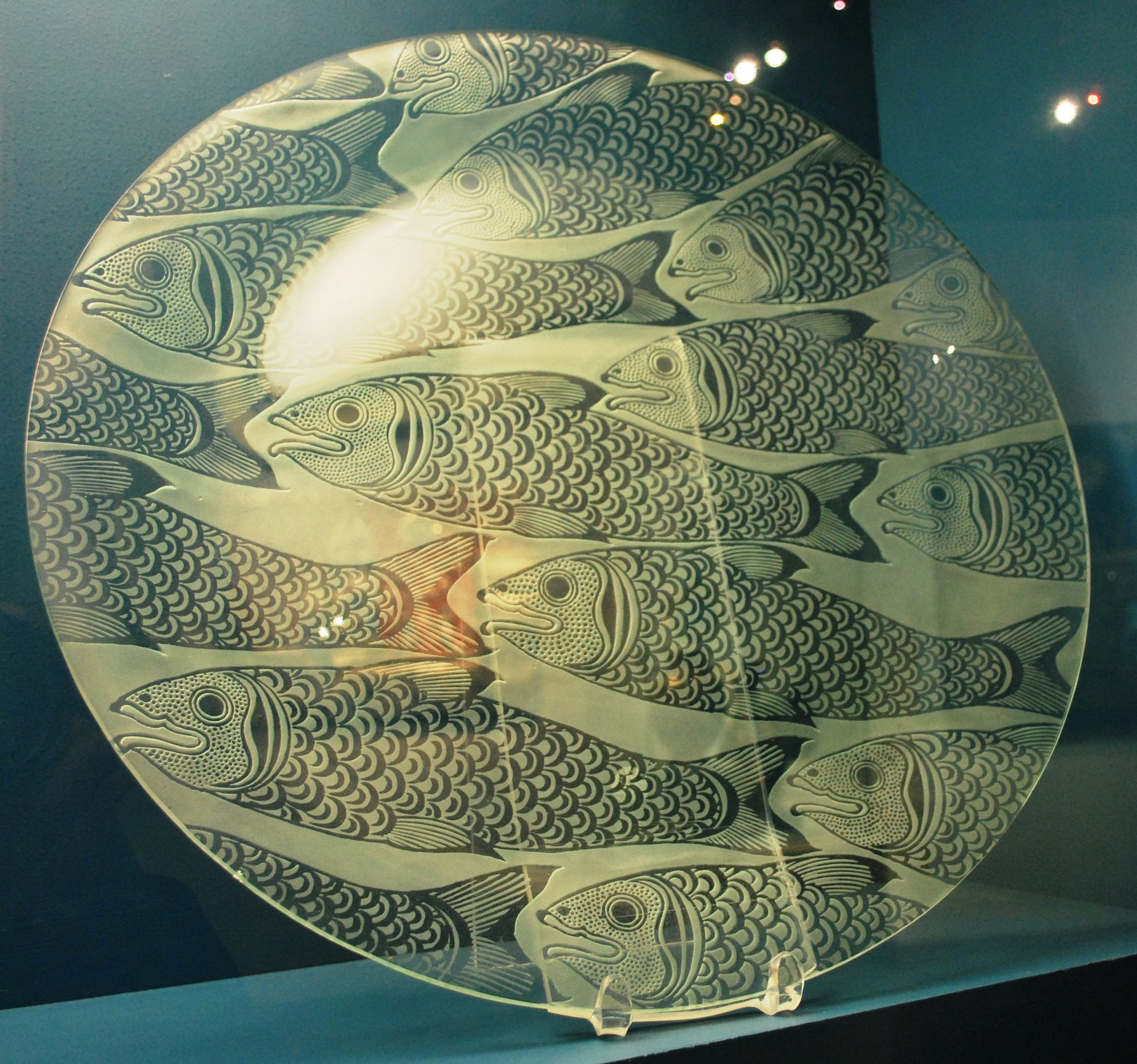
Twenty first century etched plate from Mexico

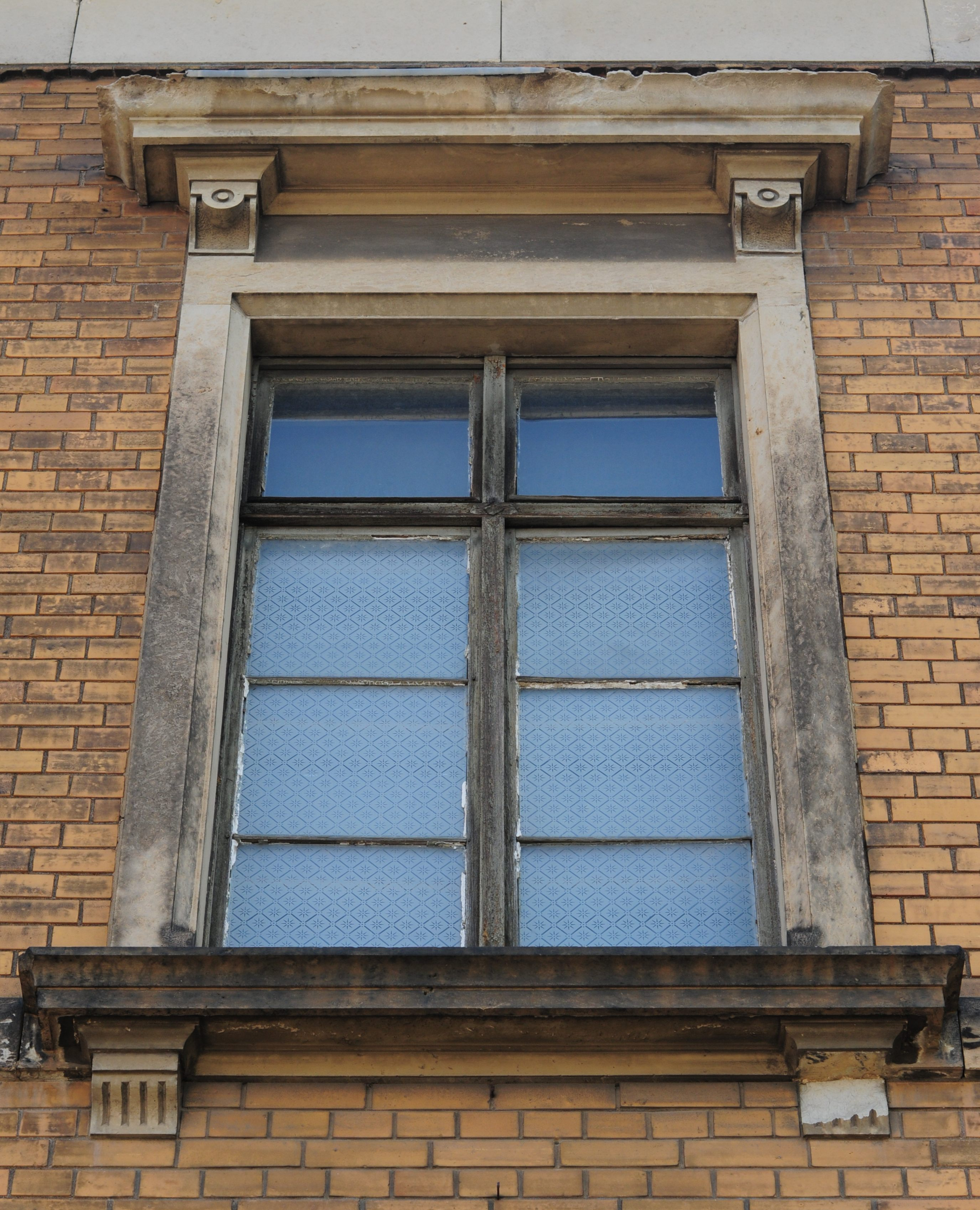
A window with etched glass in the historical regional hospital of Zwickau

== See also ==
- Glass engraving
- Laser engraving
- Satin glass
- Sea glass
