= New Martinsville Glass Company =

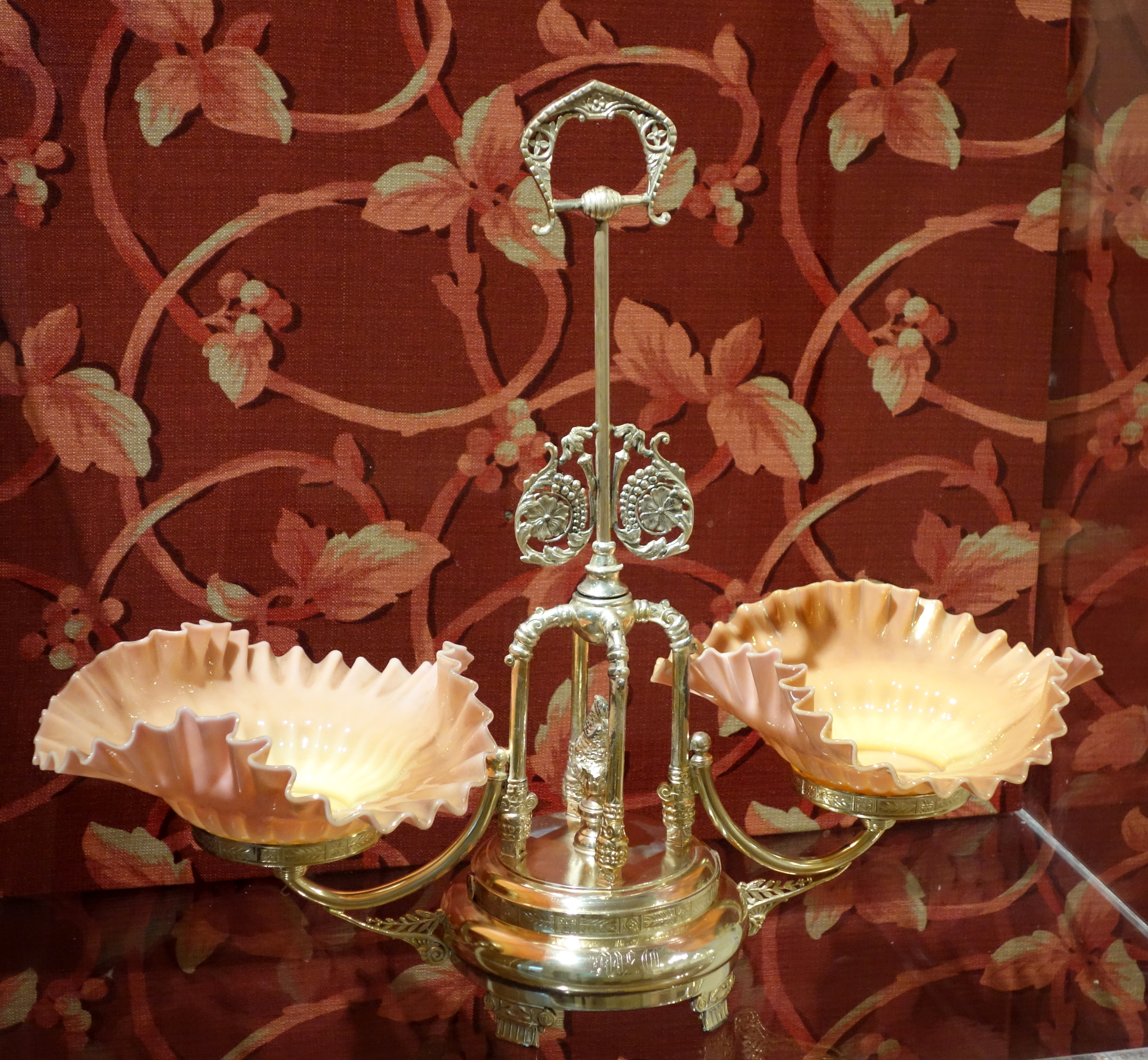
- Double Bride's Basket, c. 1905
- Company type: Public company
- Founded: (1901)
- Defunct: 1984
- Headquarters: New Martinsville, West Virginia, United States

The New Martinsville Glass Company was an American manufacturer of decorative glass products. It opened in 1901 in New Martinsville, West Virginia. The company was renowned for the use of color in their glassware. They initially made tableware but quickly expanded into vanities, bar ware, lamps, and more. They promoted liquor sets even through prohibition. The company was renamed Viking Glass in 1944.

== Early years ==
The New Martinsville was founded in 1901 in an old glass factory in New Martinsville, West Virginia. At first, it relied upon pressed glass patterns for the majority of its income. By 1905 the company began embellishing their work by adding gold paint and ruby stain.

== Use of color ==
New Martinsville Glass Company used an extensive list of colors in their glassware. A list of colors follows: Amber, Ruby, Evergreen, Amethyst, Cobalt Blue, Ritz Blue, Rose, Jade, Pale Blue, Light Green, Pink, Black, Yellow

== Patterns ==
- Raindrops (No. 14)
- Queen Anne (No. 18)
- Modernistic (No. 33)
- Addie (No. 34)
- Fancy Square (No. 35)
- Oscar (No. 36)
- Moondrops (No. 37)
- Hostmaster (Repeal) (No. 38)
- Radiance (No. 42)
- Icicle and Window (No. 43)
- Teardrop (No. 44)
- Janice (No. 45)
- Roberto (Etch No. 24)
- Meadow Wreath (Etch No. 26)
- Rose and Robin (Etch No. 28)
- Florentine (Etch No. 29)
- Wild Rose (Etch No. 30)
- Canterbury (Etch No. 31)
- Mt. Vernon
- Prelude (Viking Etch)

== Pattern Identification Gallery ==
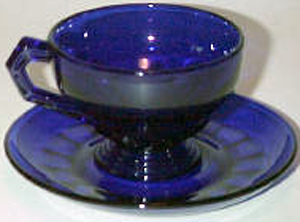
Hostmaster or Repeal

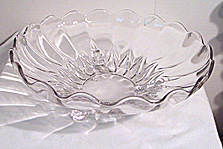
Janice

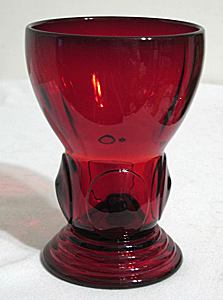
Moondrops

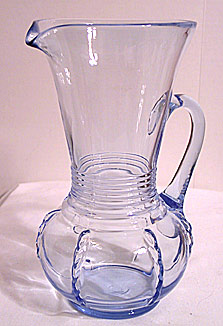
Radiance
