= Hostmaster =

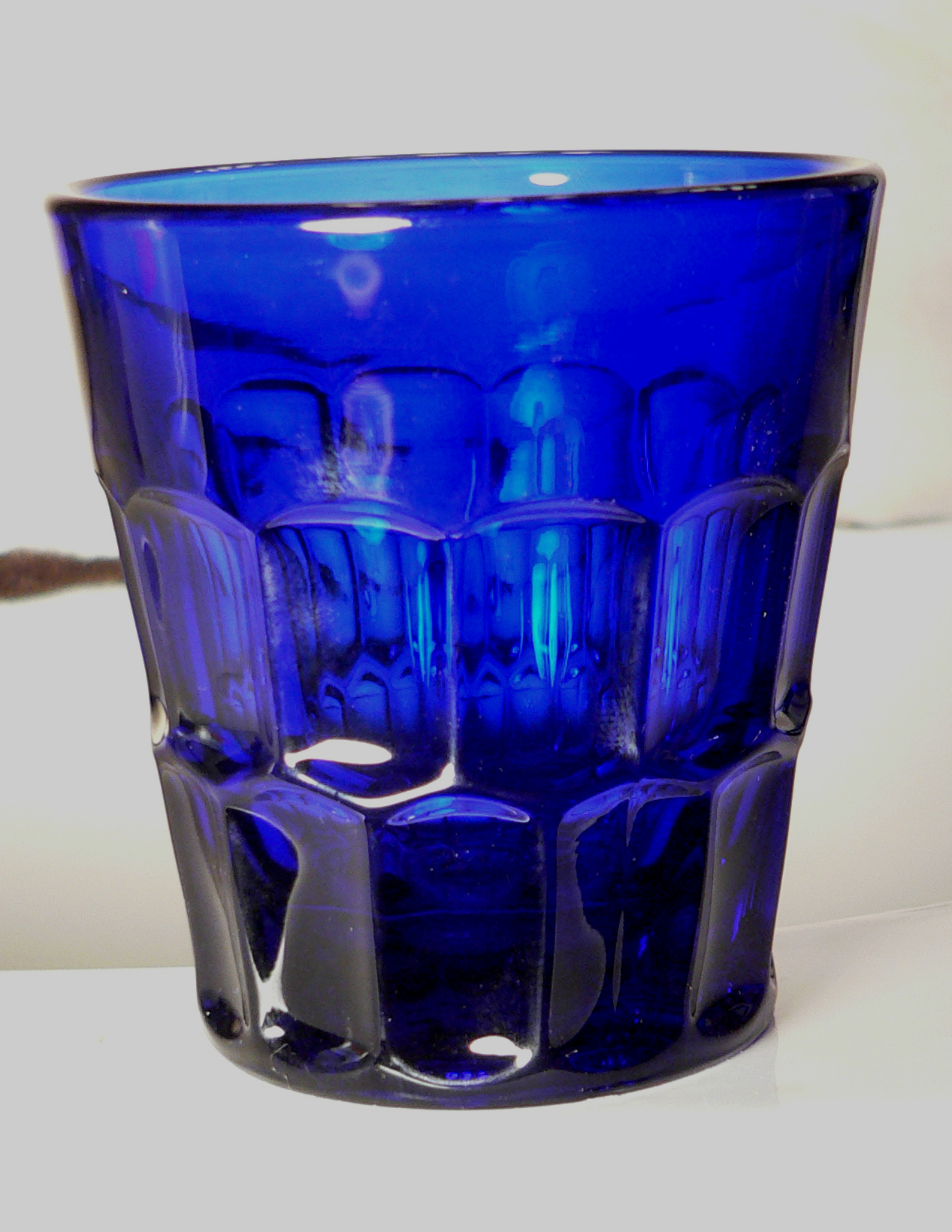
Hostmaster 7 ounce tumbler.

The Hostmaster Pattern was manufactured by New Martinsville Glass Company (which later became Viking Glass Company) during the 1930s. Though the line was extensive, New Martinsville Hostmaster Pattern is one of the lesser known patterns of Elegant Glass. There are no reproductions as the mold was melted down to make the Raindrops pattern (line #14).

== New Martinsville Glass Company ==
The New Martinsville Glass Company opened in 1901 in New Martinsville, West Virginia. They were renowned for the use of color in their glassware. They promoted liquor sets even through Prohibition. The company was renamed Viking Glass in 1944.

== Colors ==
Colors for the Hostmaster pattern included Cobalt, Amethyst, Ruby, Amber, Evergreen (dark green), Crystal, and Pink.

== Quality ==
Many of the pieces in this pattern are made from a 3 or 4 part mold. All pieces have been fire-polished after being pressed. The surface of the pieces are smooth and glossy. They have few air bubbles and when held up to the light, there are not many ripples or irregularities. The bases of the tumblers and plates have been hand ground down allowing them to lay flat. The creamer, sugars, tea cup, decanter, and ice bucket do not have a ground base.

== Aliases ==
Repeal: this pattern was released in 1933 to celebrate the repeal of prohibition. The release included a decanter and other pieces of bar-ware. An advertisement has been found with the title "Repeal Set" over a liquor set, but it is doubtful that this was intended to be a name for the pattern.
Pattern #38: This is the company manufacturer number.

== Pieces manufactured ==
- Bitters Bottle
- Cocktail Shaker
- Creamer
- Cup & Saucer
- Decanter (12½”)
- Flared Bowl (12")
- Flat Tumbler (9 Oz / 4½”)
- Footed Tumbler
- Highball Glass (10 OZ)
- Ice Bucket (3½”)
- Jigger
- Luncheon Plate (8½”)
- Old Fashioned (7 OZ)
- Pitcher
- Platter
- Pretzel Jar (Covered)
- Sherbet
- Shot Glass (2 OZ)
- Soup Bowl
- Sugar
- Vase
- Water Goblet

== Gallery ==
Tea Cups

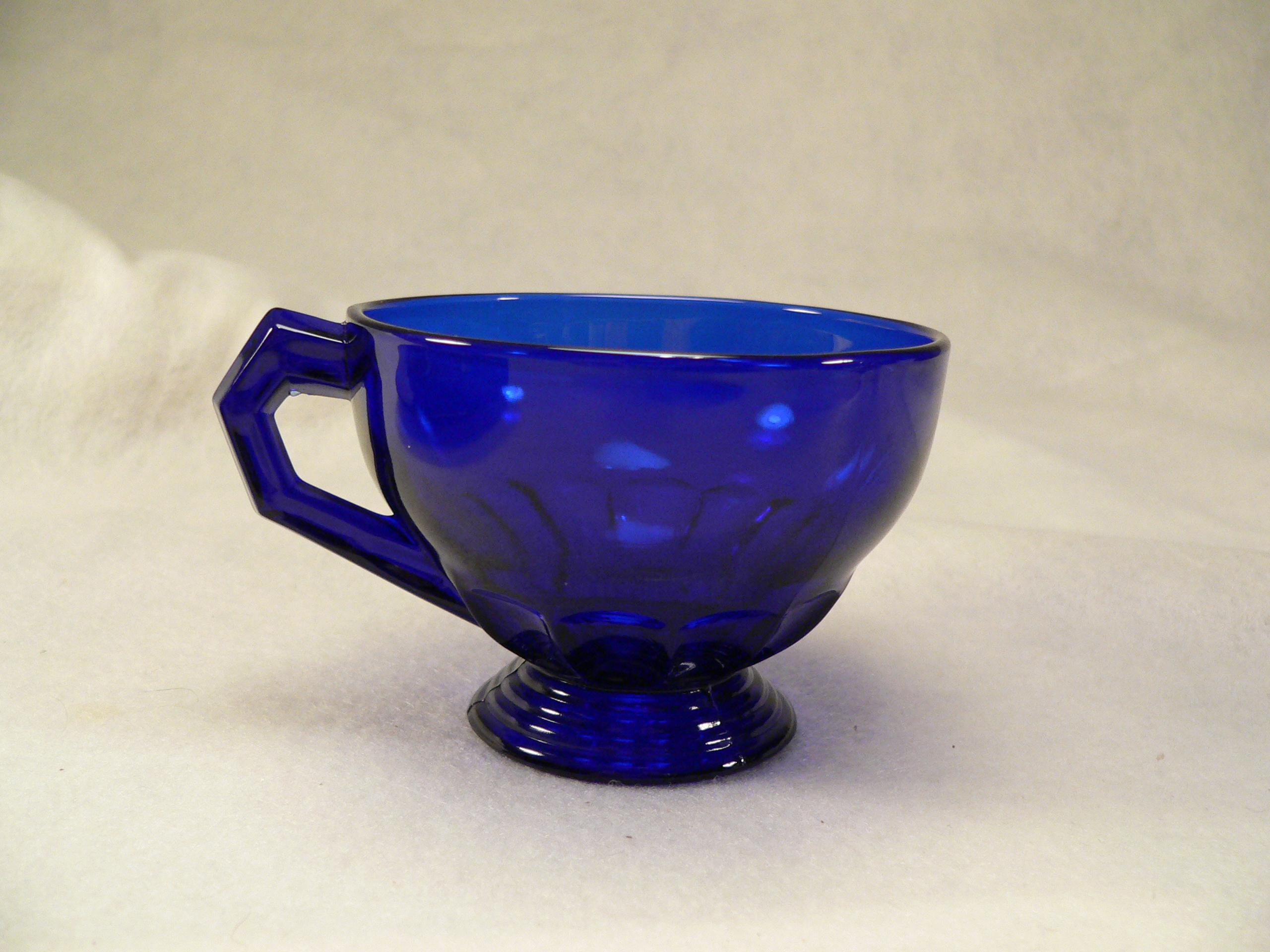
Tea Cup - Cobalt

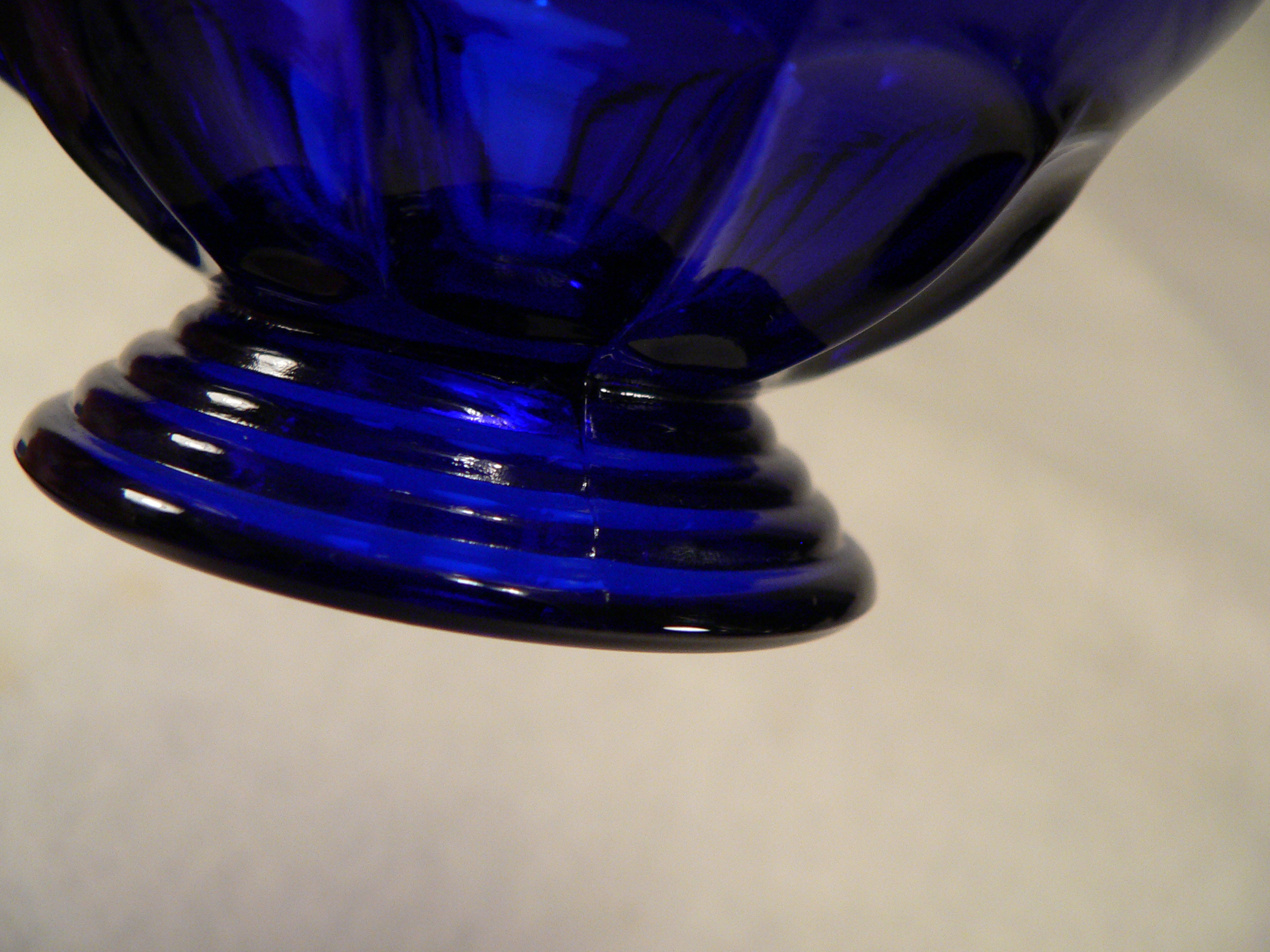
Tea Cup Bottom - Cobalt

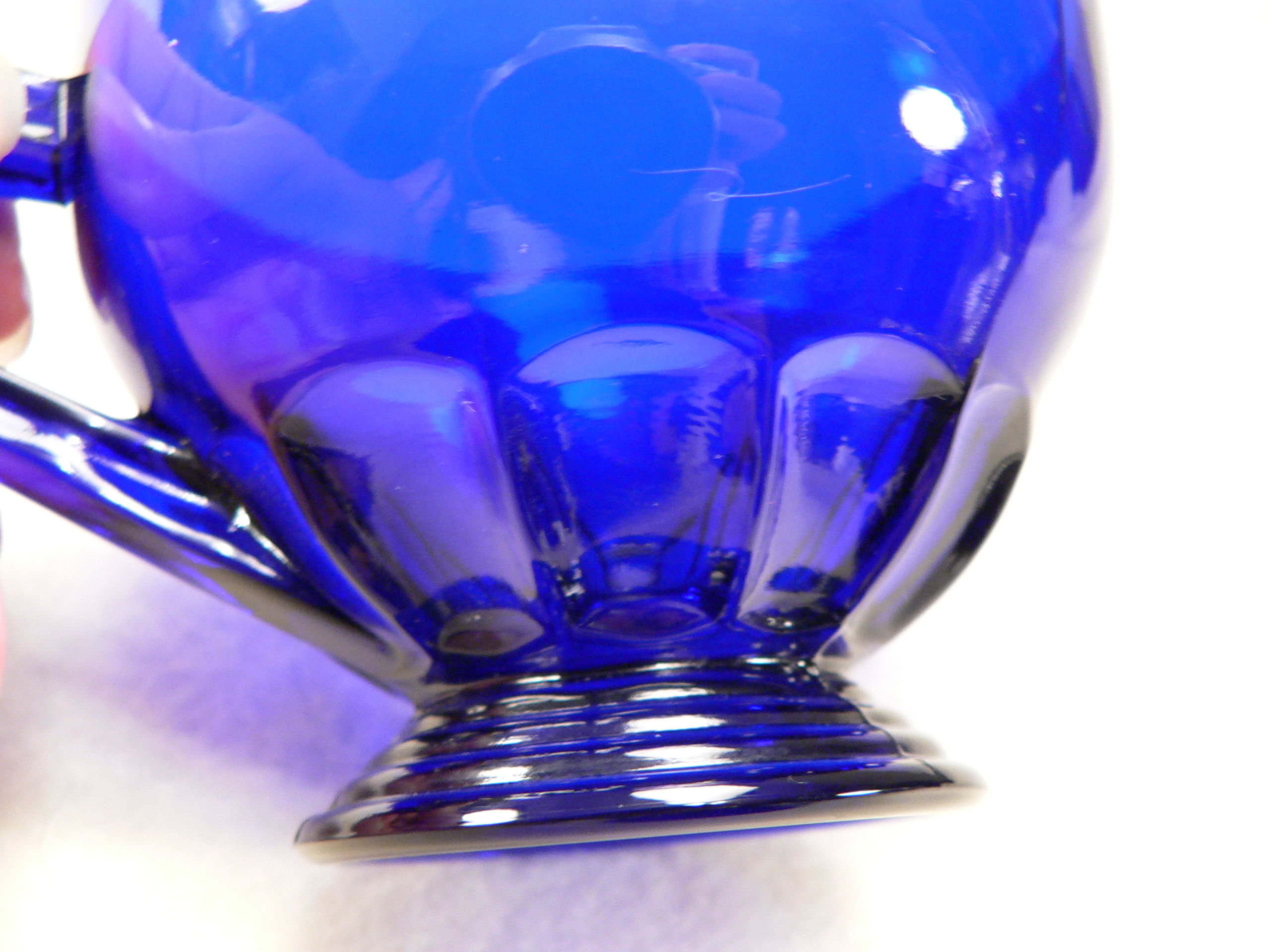
Tea Cup Side - Cobalt

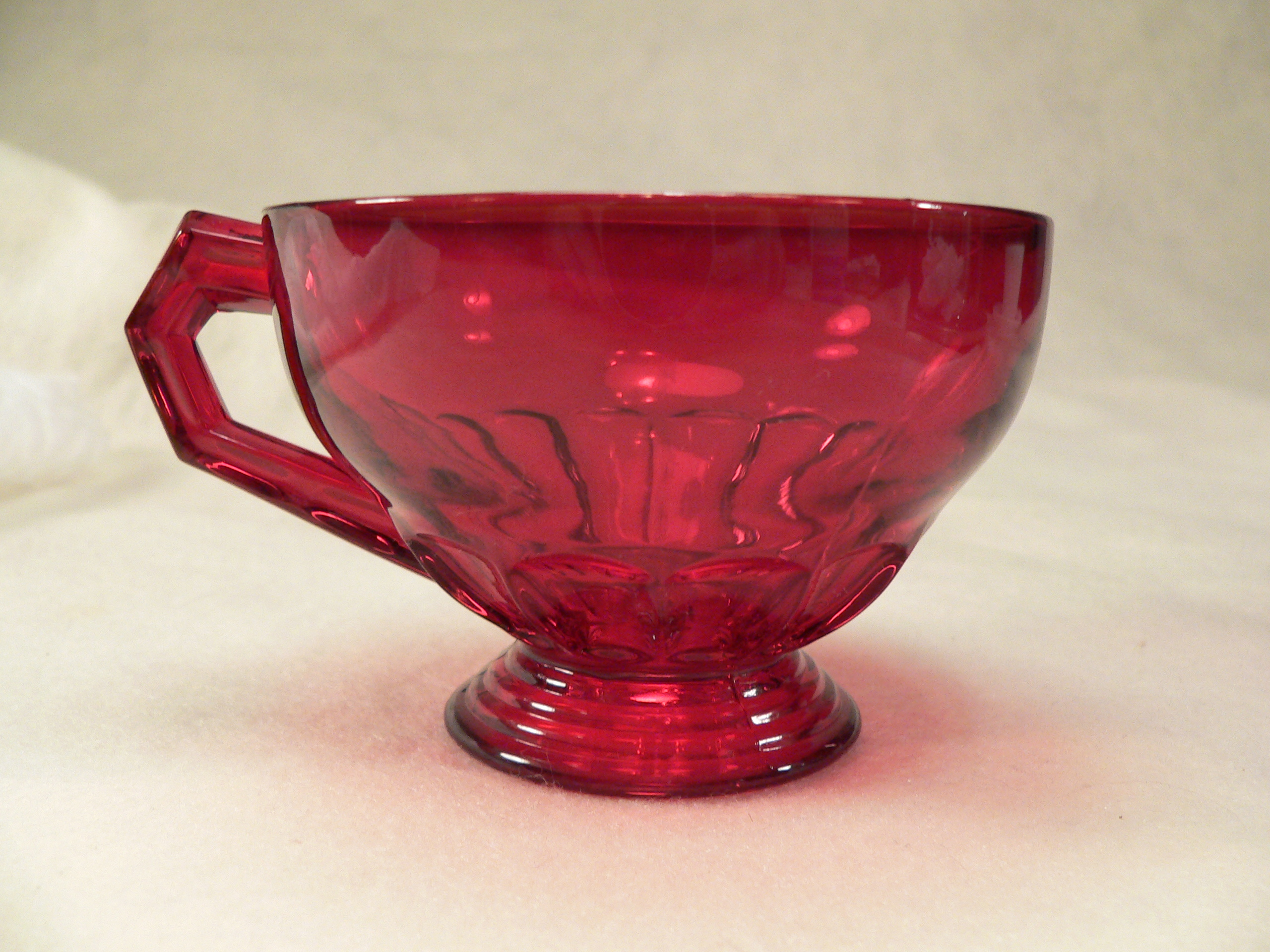
Tea Cup - Red

Plates

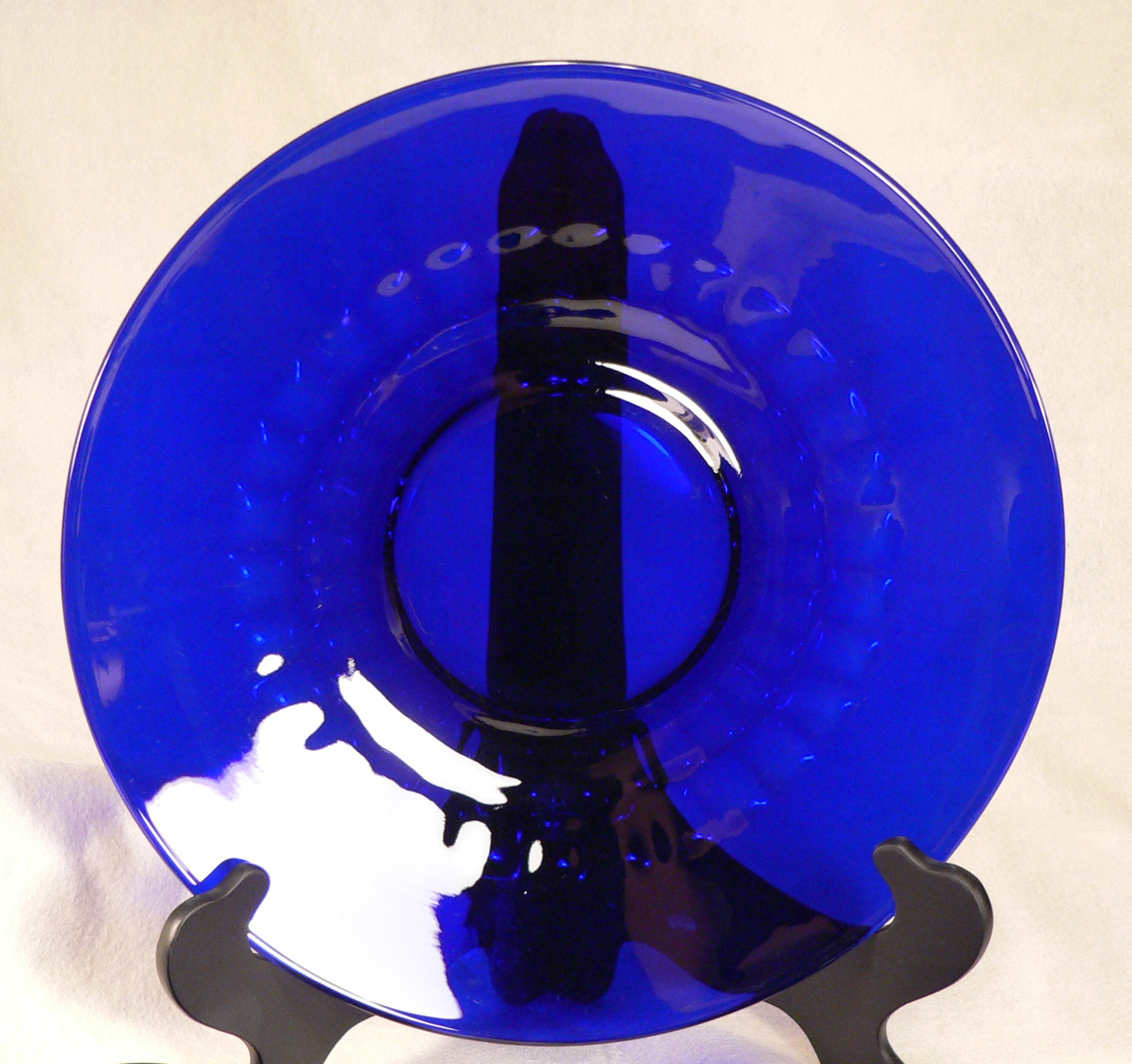
Large Serving Platter - Cobalt

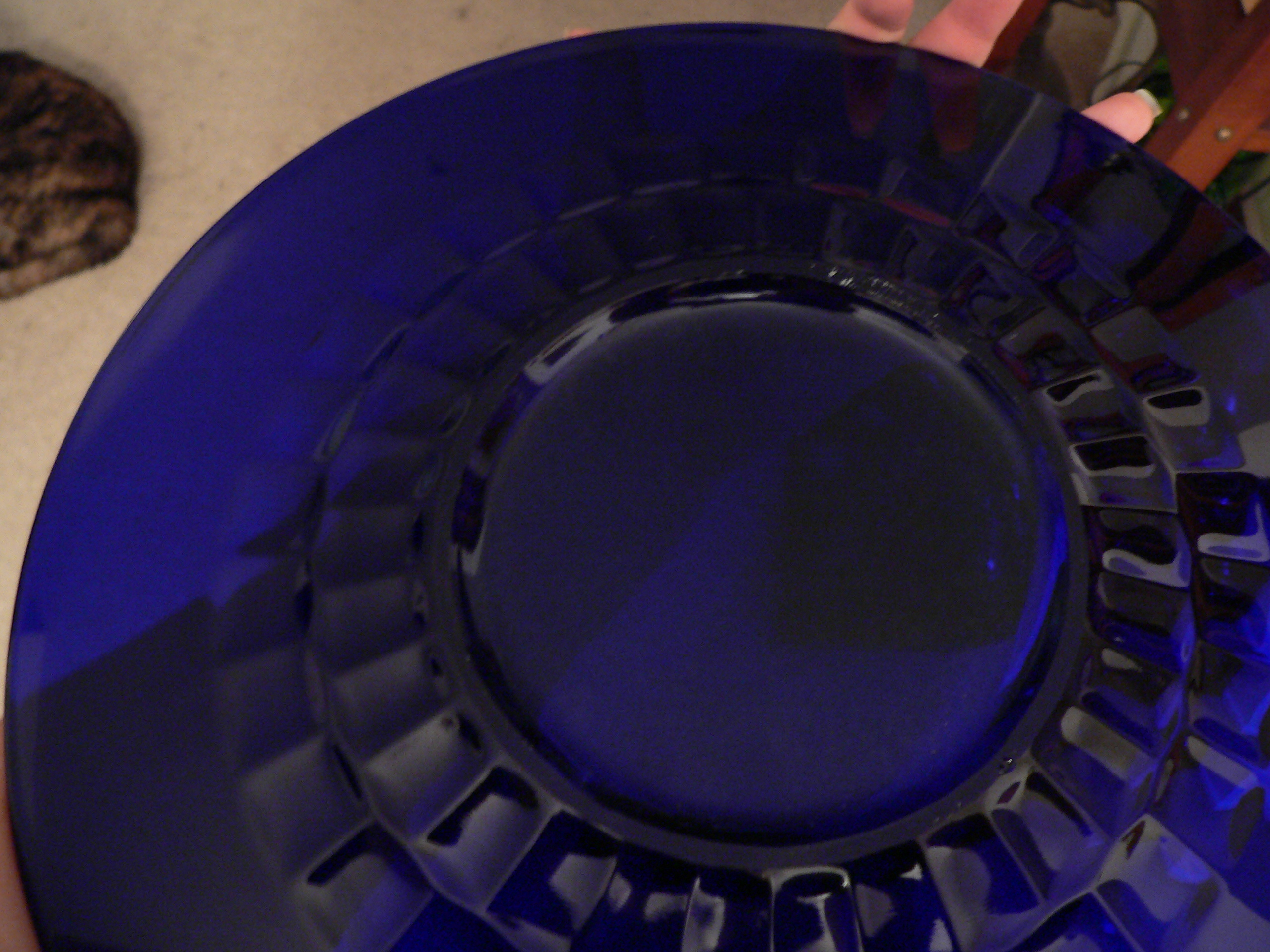
Platter Back - Cobalt

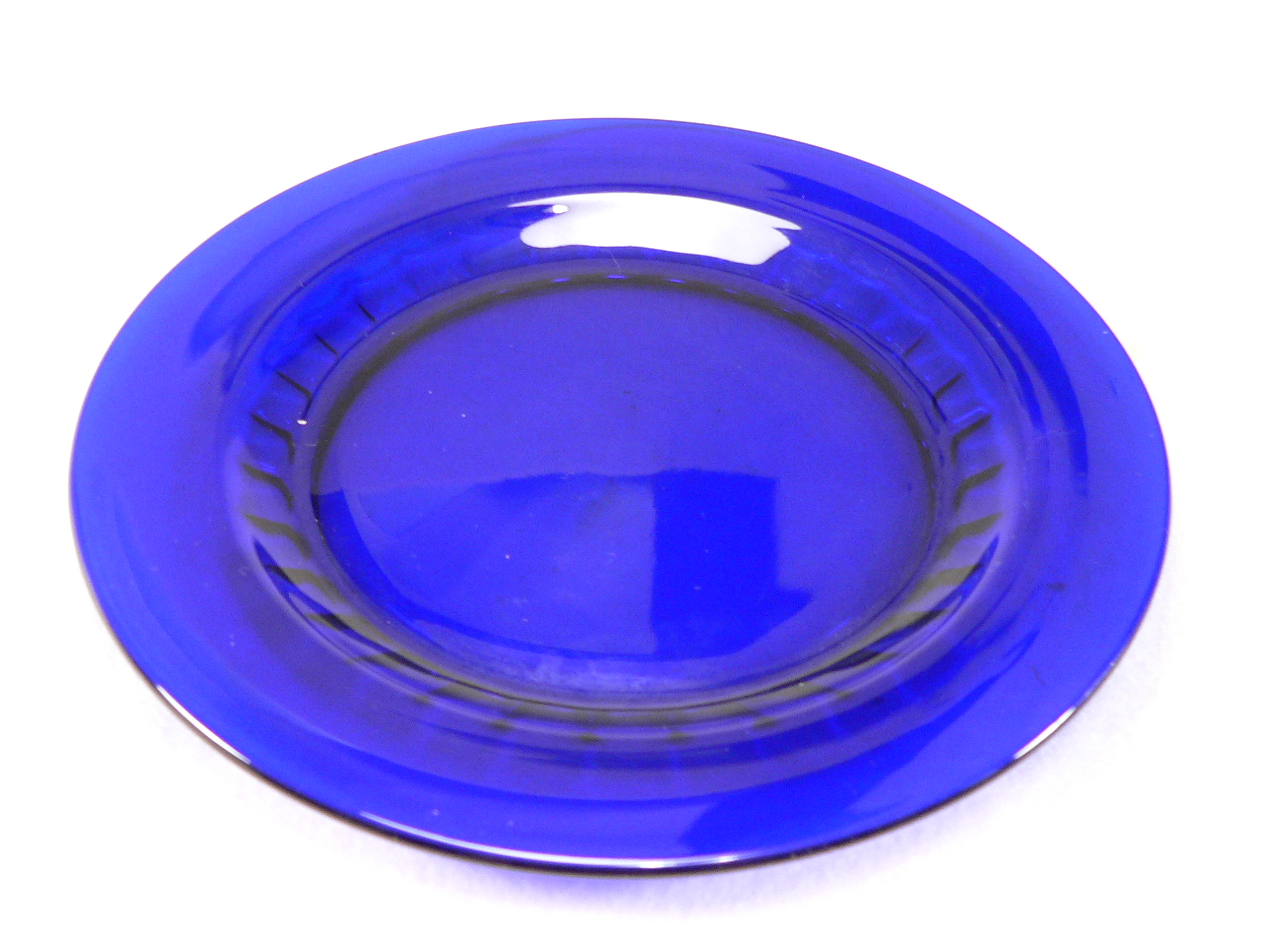
Plate - Cobalt

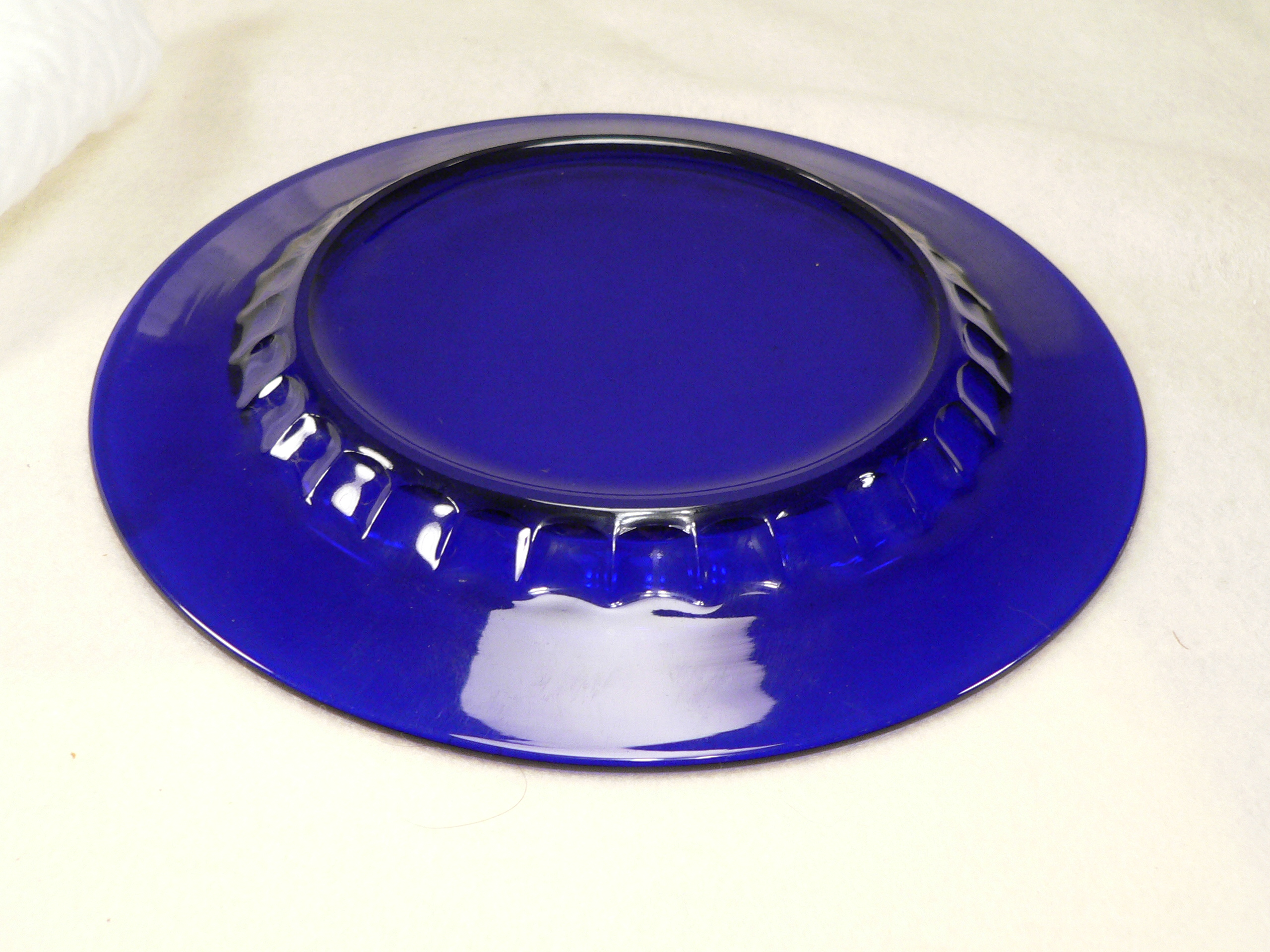
Plate Bottom - Cobalt

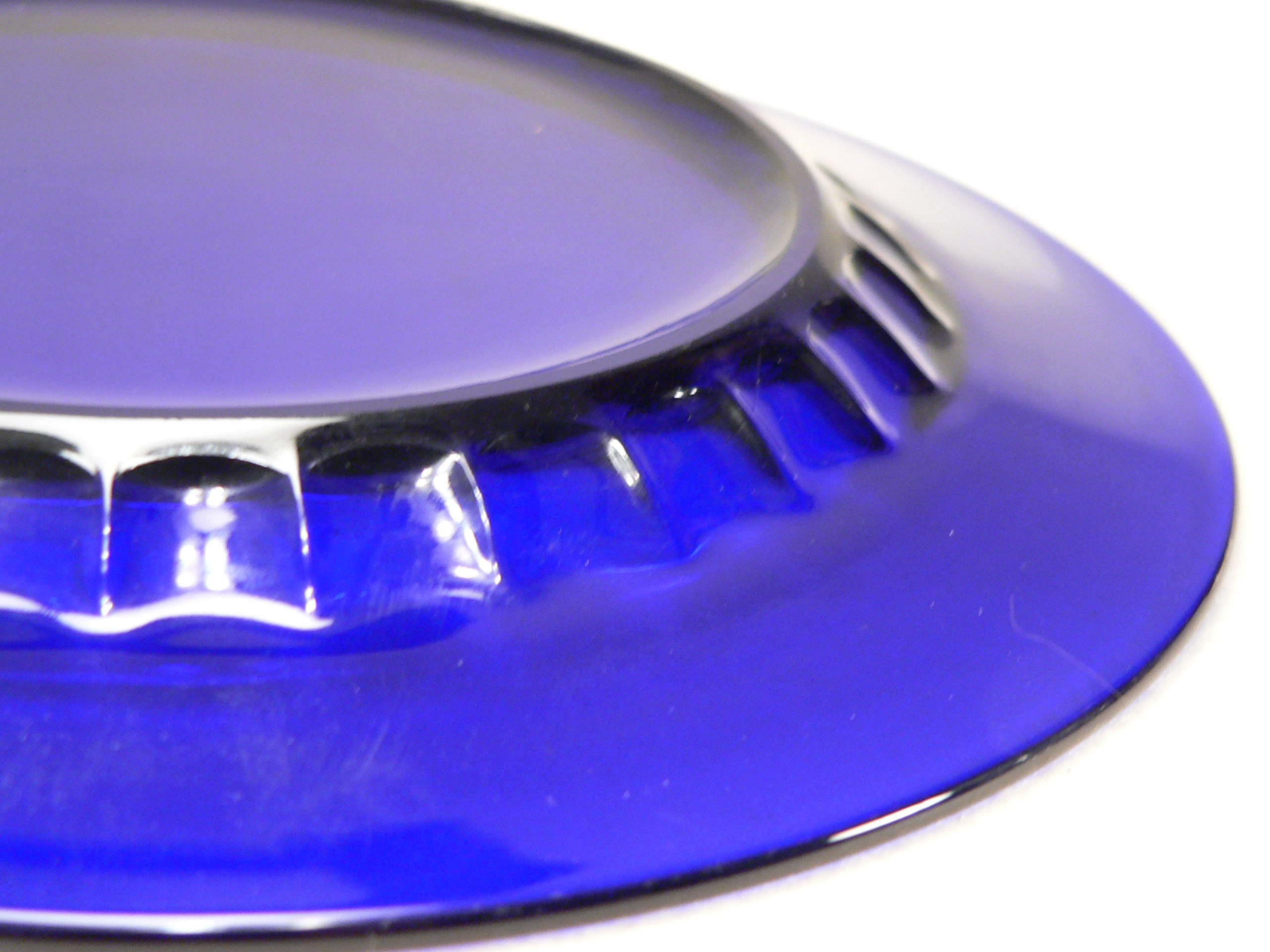
Plate Side - Cobalt

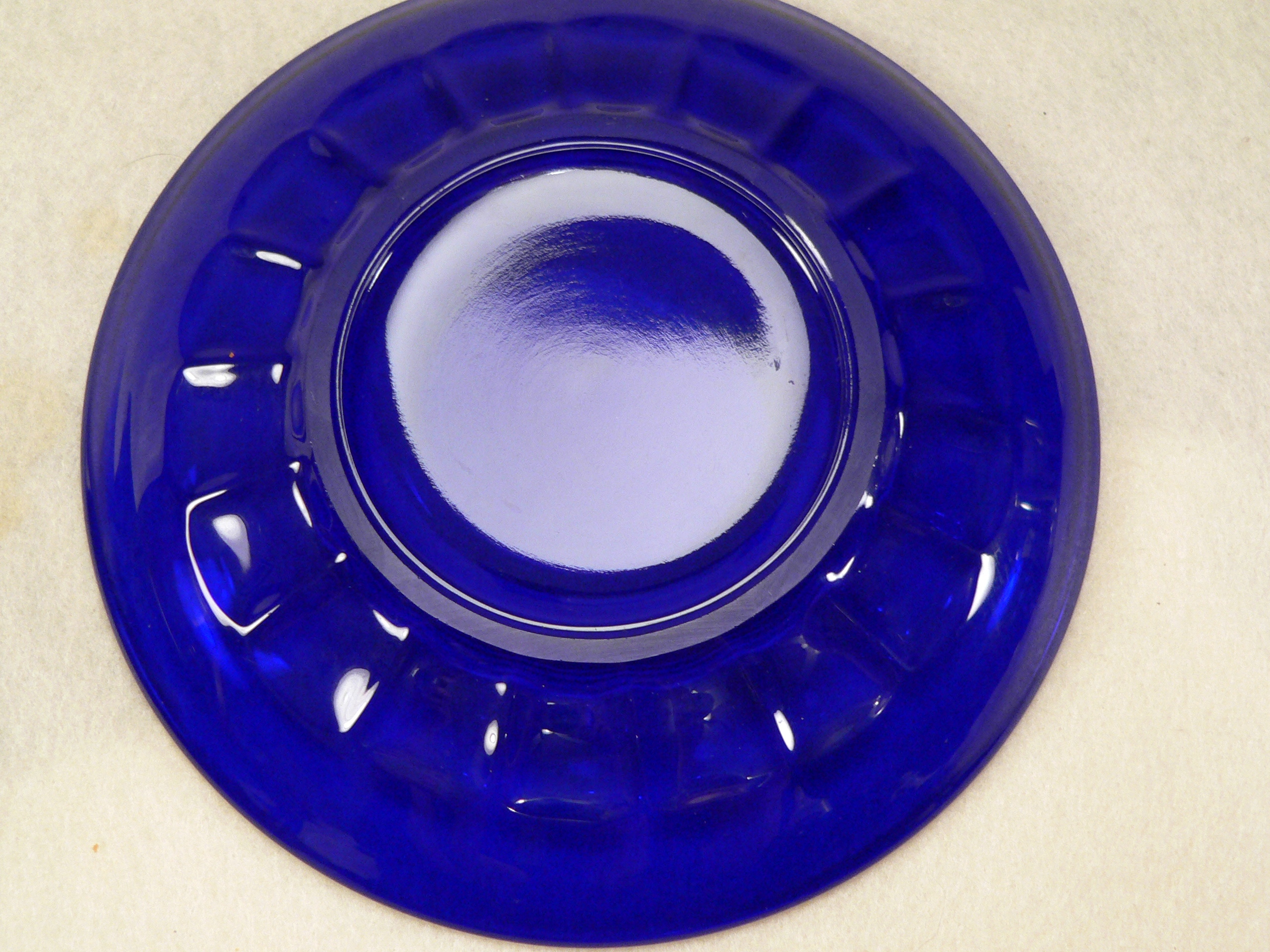
Saucer Bottom - Cobalt

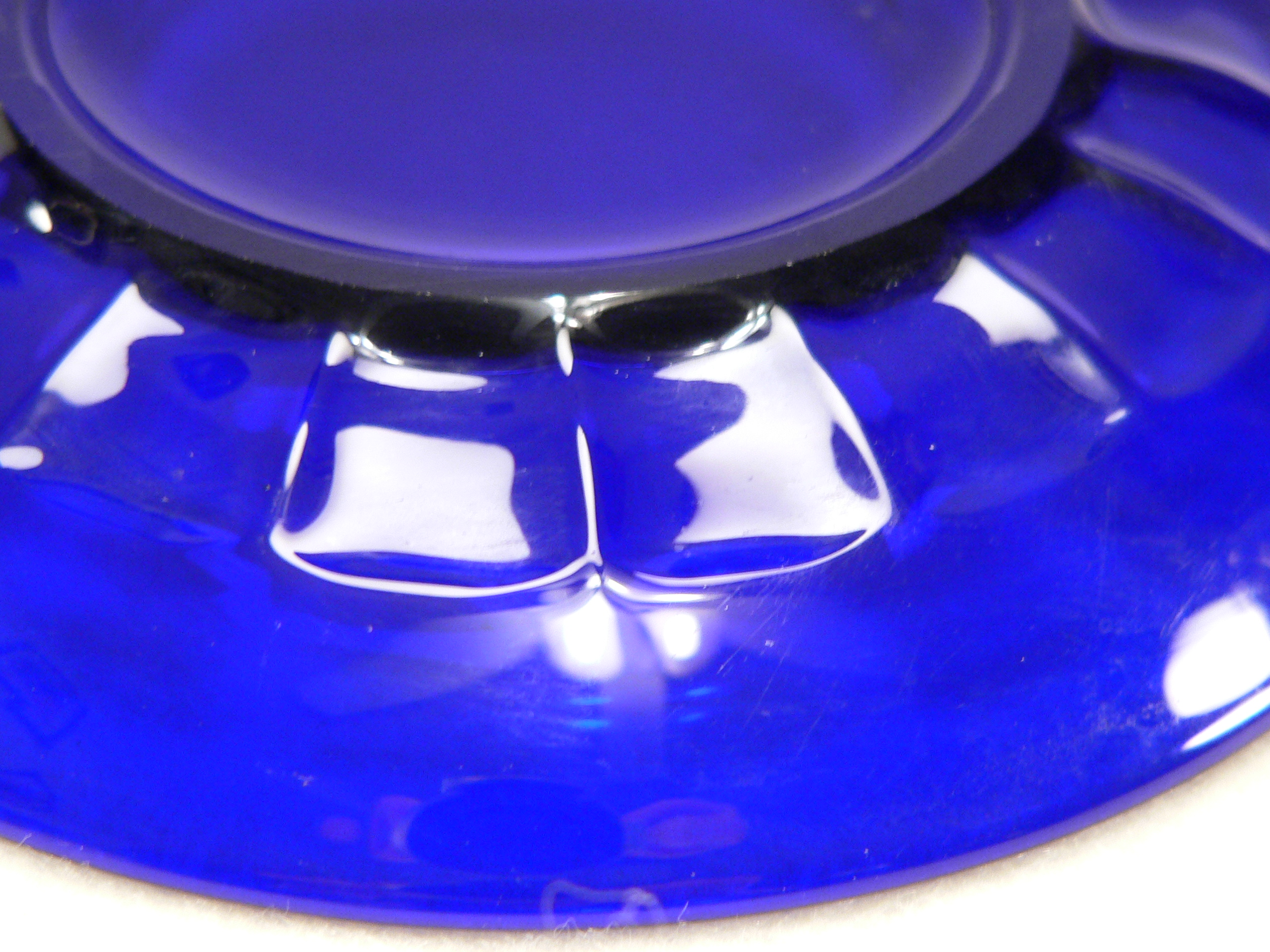
Saucer Side - Cobalt

Stemware

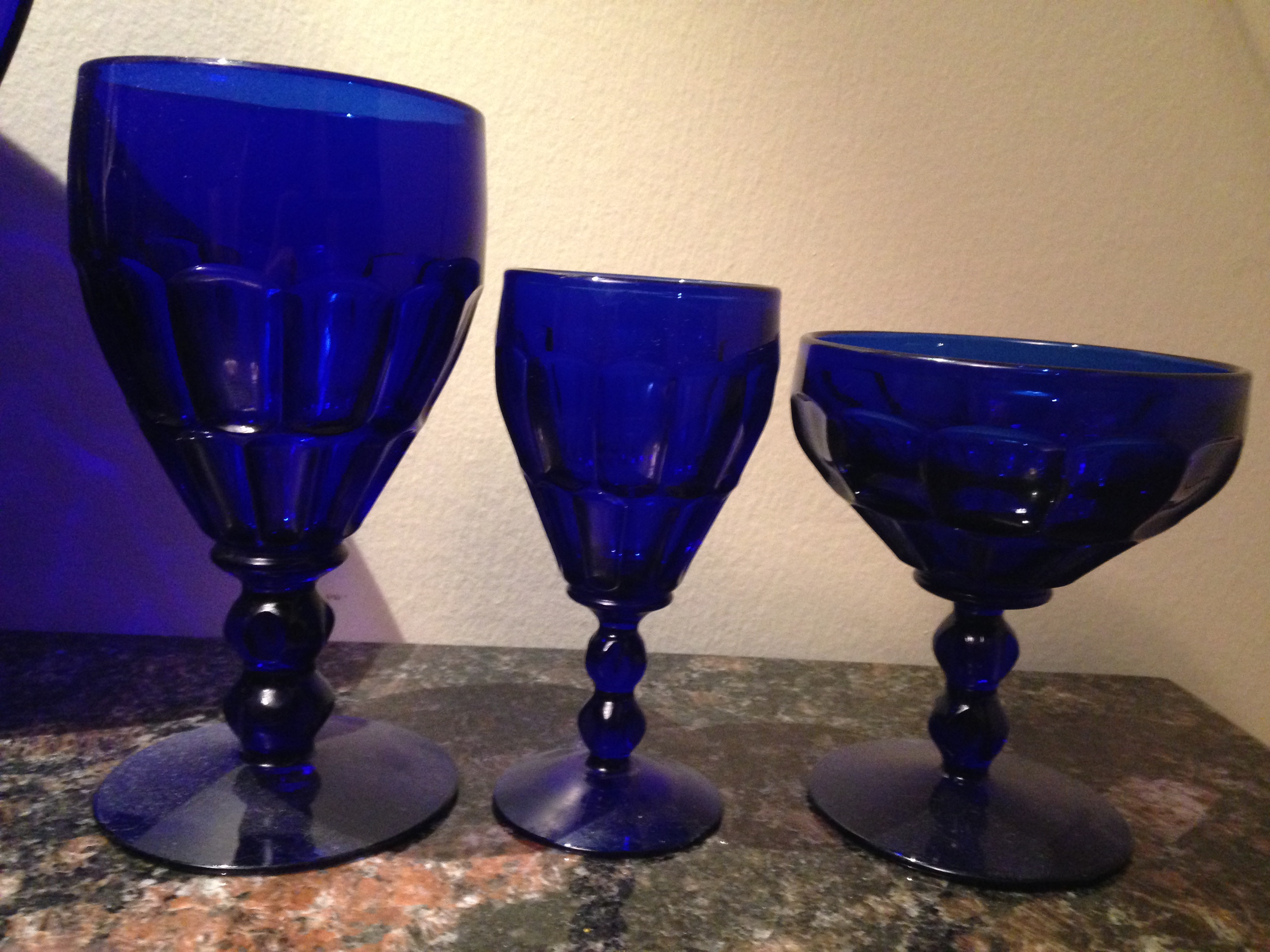
Water Glass, Wine Glass, Sherbet

Tumblers

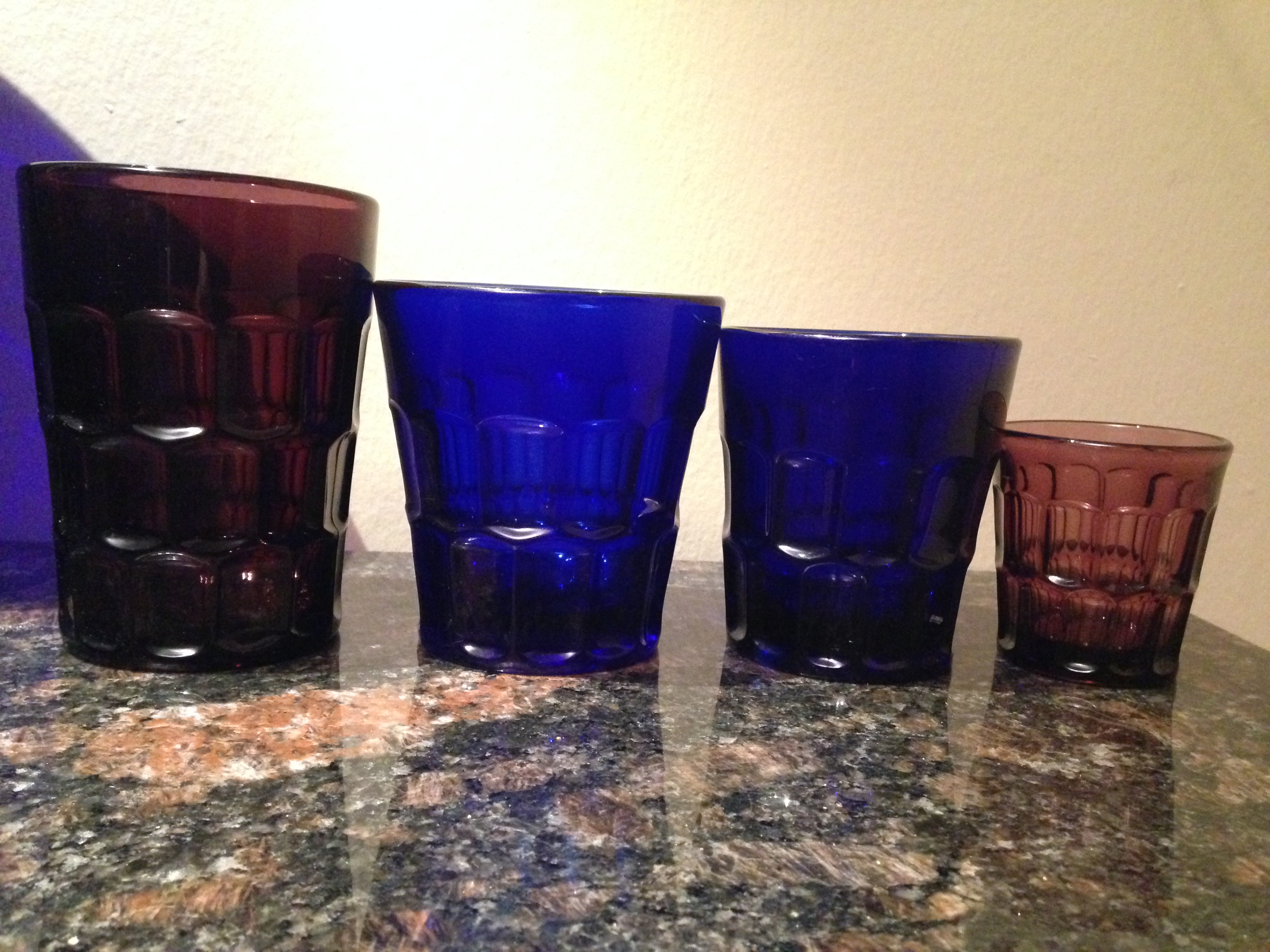
Tumblers in 8oz, 6oz, 4oz, 2oz

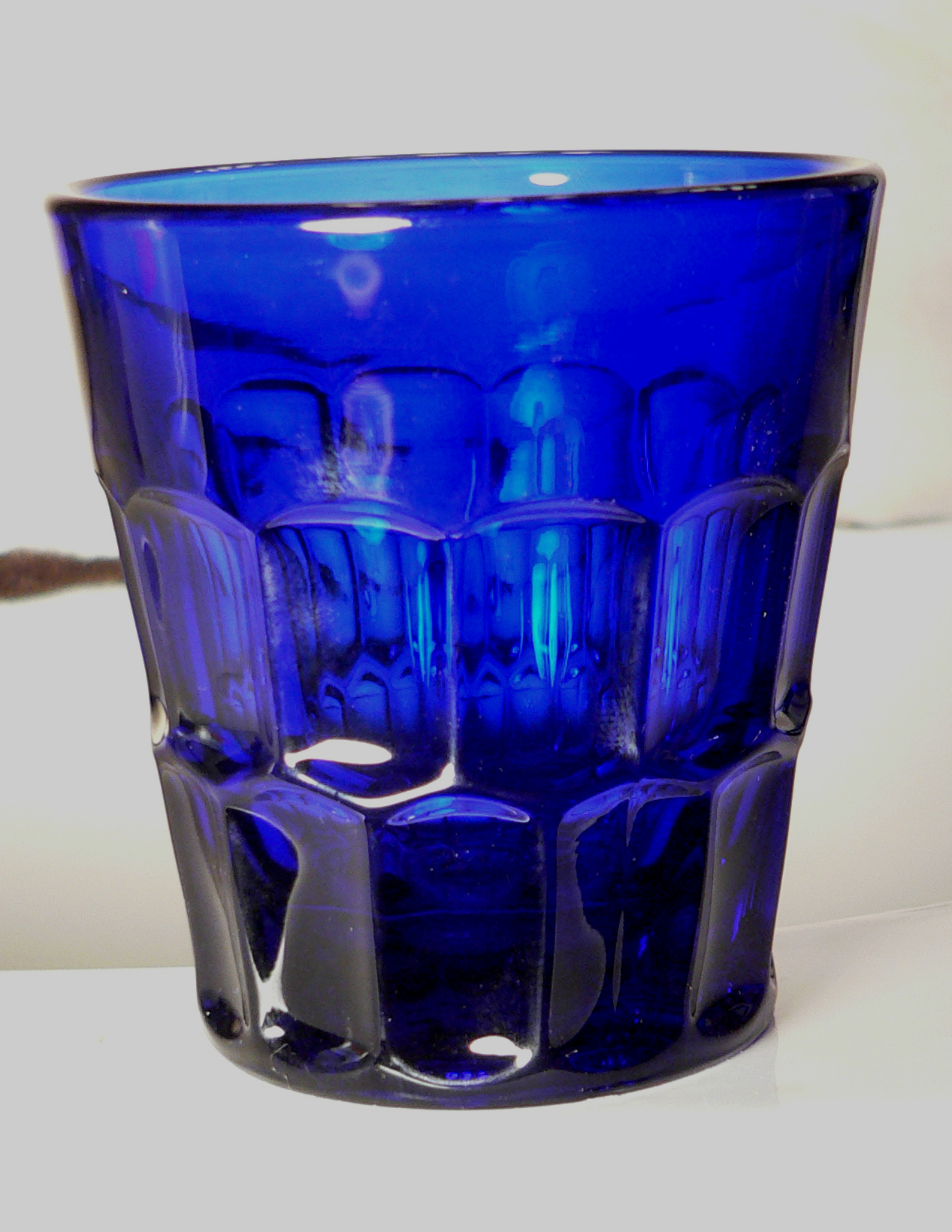
7 OZ Tumbler - Cobalt

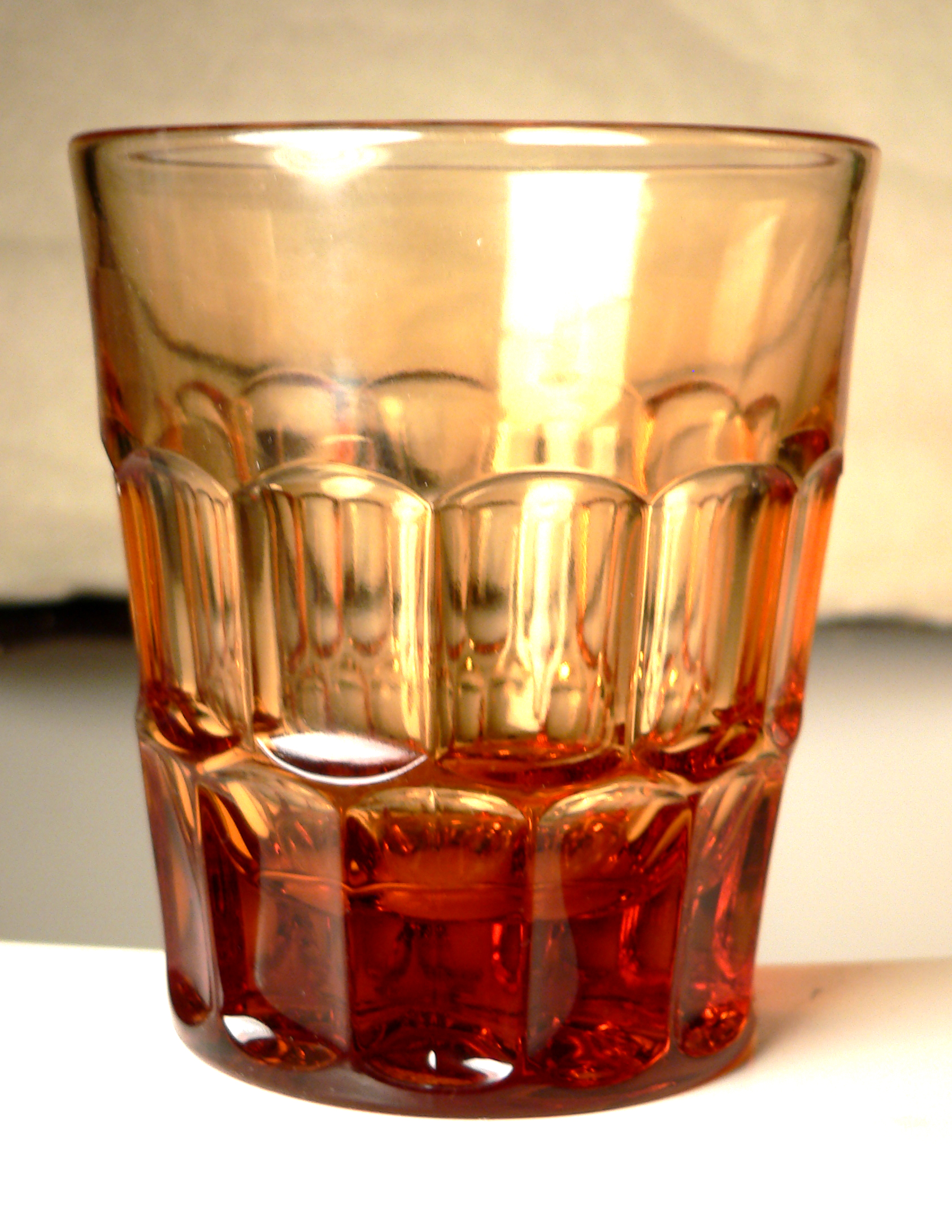
7 OZ Tumbler - Amber

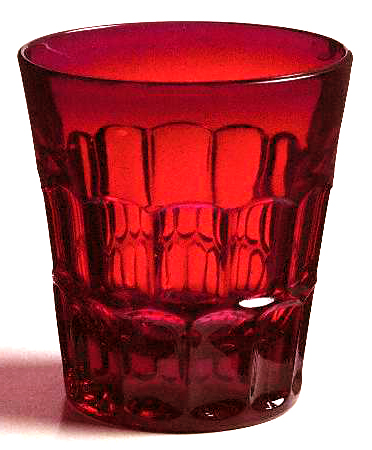
7 OZ Tumbler - Red

Cream & Sugar

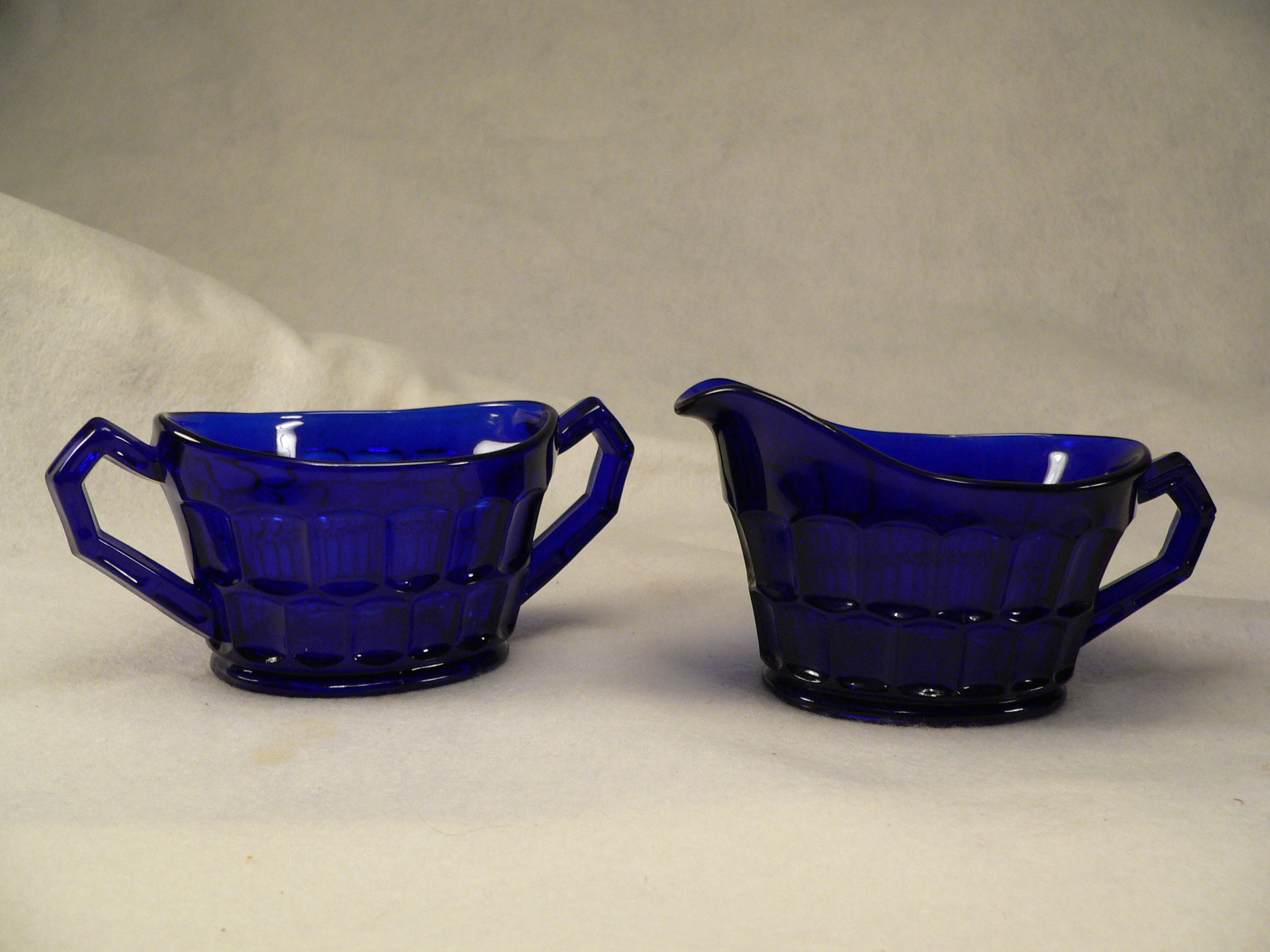
Cream and Sugar - Cobalt

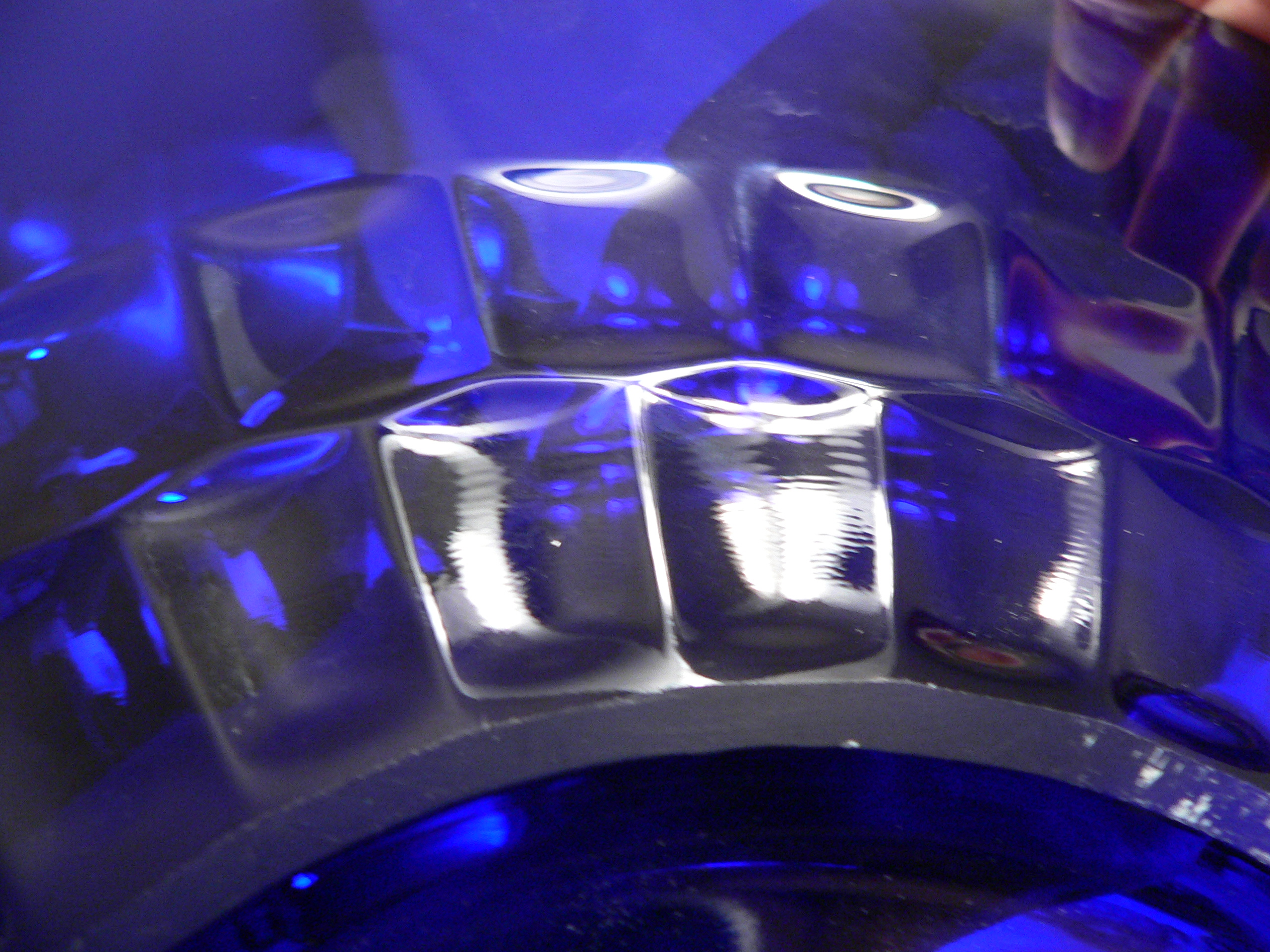
Sugar as viewed from below - Cobalt

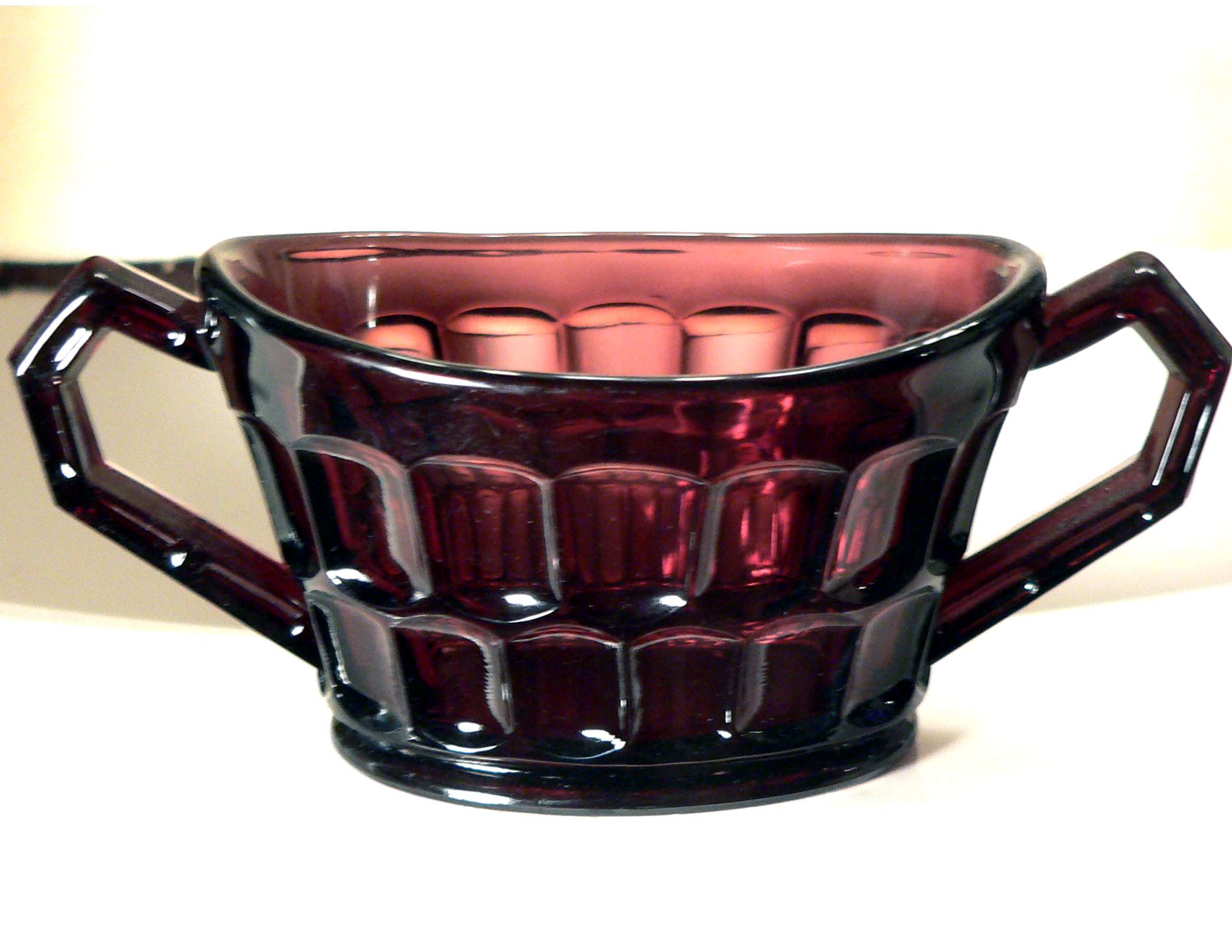
Sugar - Amethyst

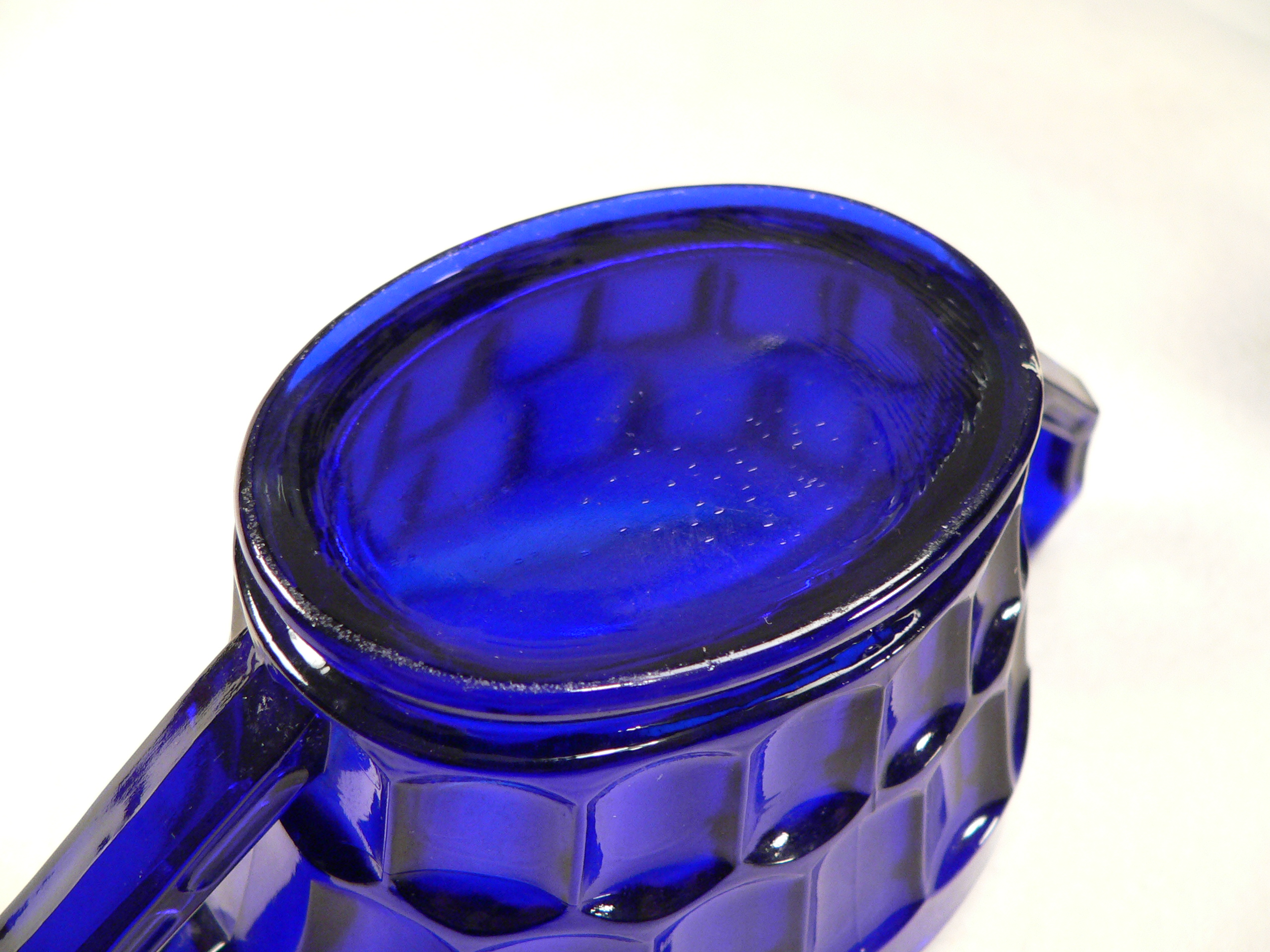
Sugar Bottom - Cobalt

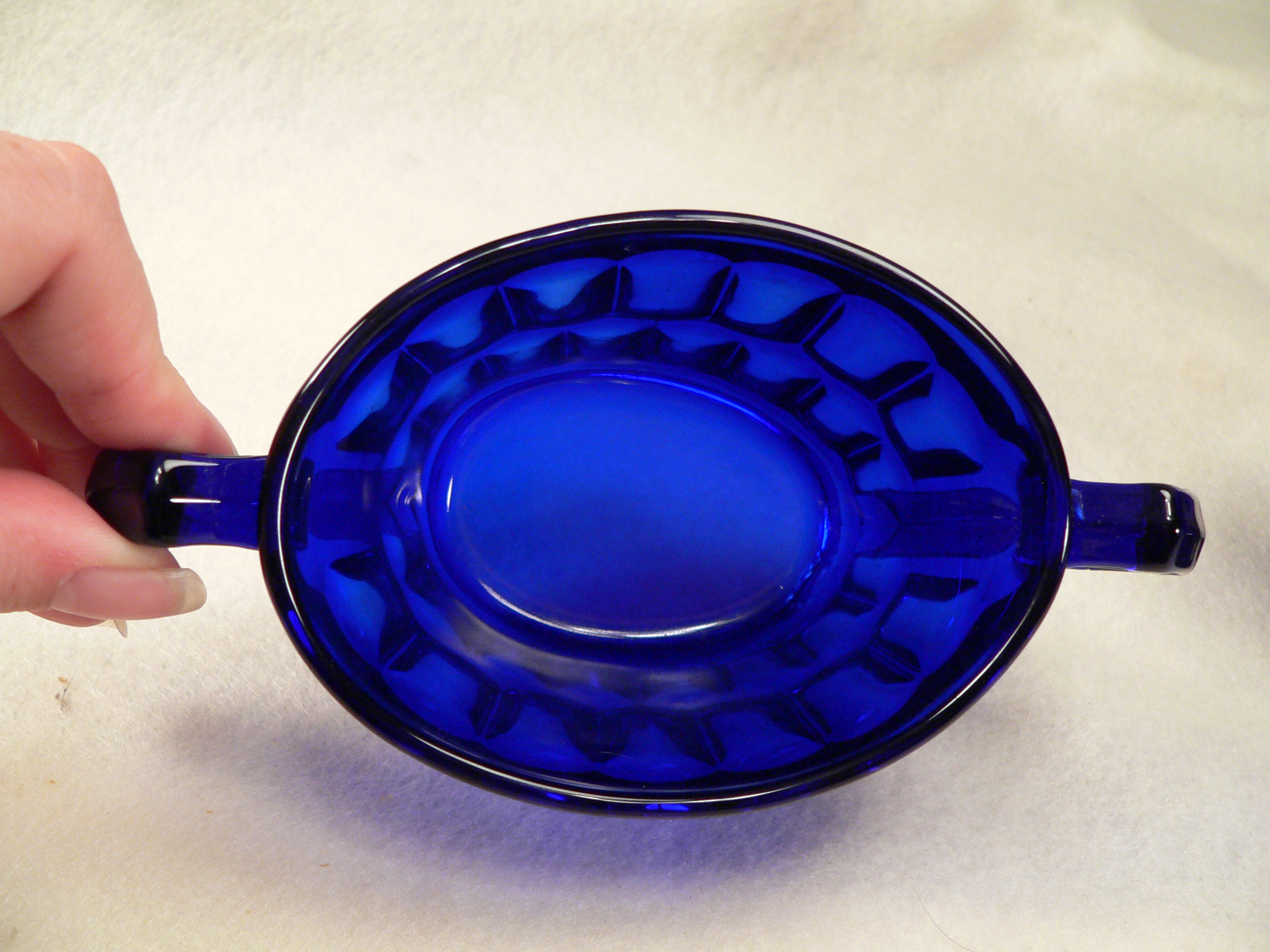
Sugar Top - Cobalt

Bowl

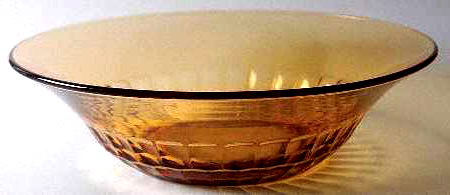
Flared Bowl - Amber

Decanter

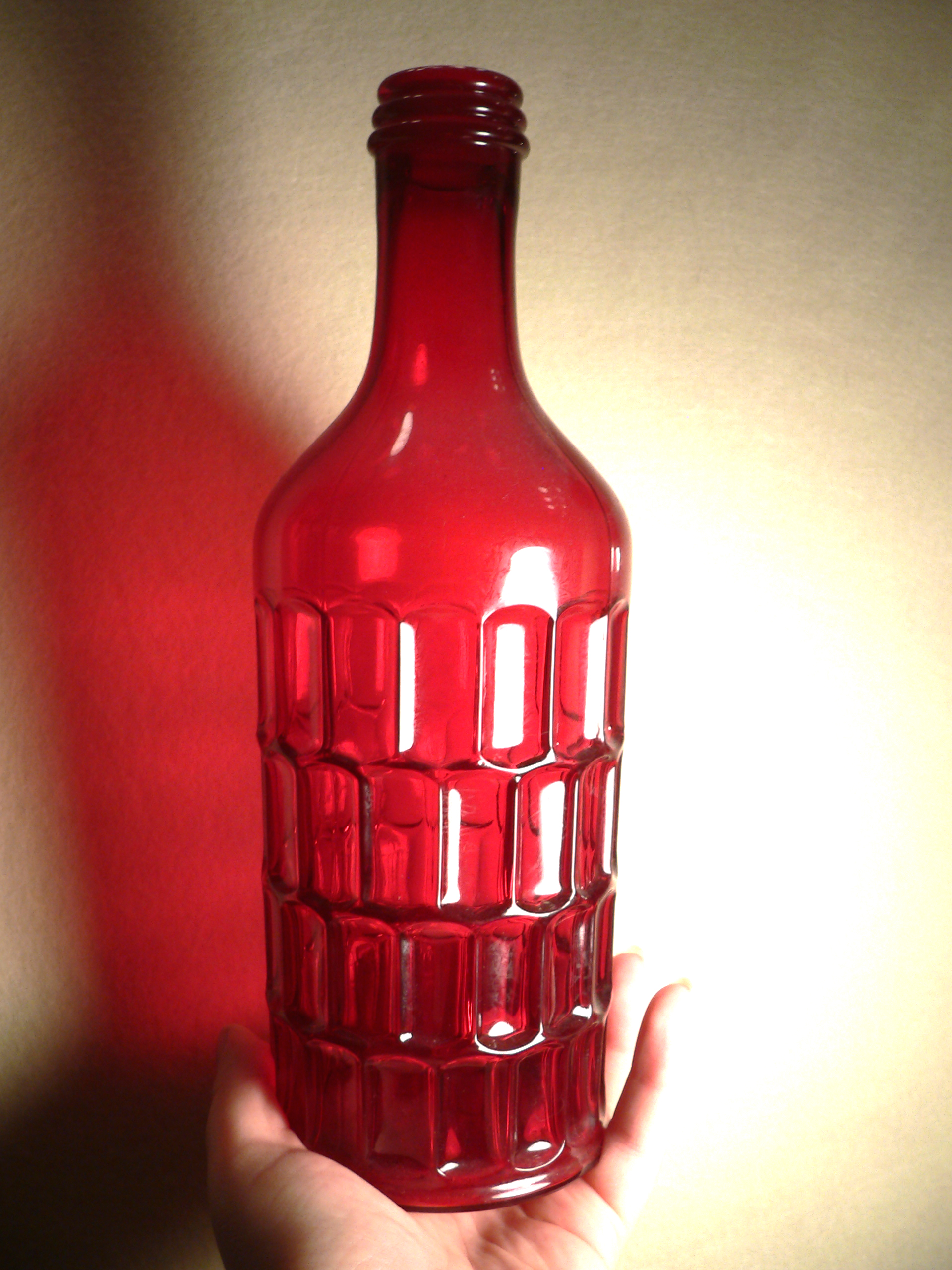
Decanter - Red

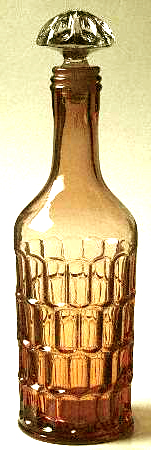
Decanter - Amber

== See also ==
- Elegant Glass
- Depression Glass
- Pressed glass
- Vaseline glass
