= Jadeite (kitchenware) =

Opaque jade-green milk glass used for kitchenware and dinnerware

Jadeite (also spelled Jadite or Jade-ite, depending on manufacturer) is an opaque, jade-green milk glass that was widely produced for kitchenware and dinnerware in the United States from the 1930s through the 1970s. Named for its resemblance to the semi-precious stone of the same name, jadeite was manufactured by three principal American glass companies—Anchor Hocking, under its Fire-King brand, McKee Glass, and Jeannette Glass—each of which used a distinct spelling and formulation. A closely related opaque blue milk glass, marketed as Delphite by Jeannette and Azur-ite by Anchor Hocking, was produced alongside it. Jadeite was sold cheaply through grocery stores, hardware stores, and five-and-dime shops, and was frequently distributed as a promotional premium with the purchase of flour, oatmeal, or gasoline. Although production had largely ended by the 1970s, jadeite experienced a dramatic resurgence in collector interest beginning in the 1990s, driven in large part by Martha Stewart's public display of her own collection, and the color remains in production today by both heritage American glassmakers and overseas manufacturers.

== Origins and terminology ==
The use of jade-colored opaque glass for tableware predates the Great Depression; light jade-toned pressed glass was produced by various American manufacturers in the late nineteenth and early twentieth centuries, a category sometimes referred to by modern collectors as Early American Pattern Glass (EAPG) jadeite. The opaque green milk glass that defines the modern jadeite category, however, originated with the McKee Glass Company in 1930, when it introduced kitchenware in a color it marketed as "Skokie Green." The Jeannette Glass Company, also based in Jeannette, Pennsylvania, followed in 1932 with a similar product line, coining the term "Jadite" for its own opaque green glass—a name that, along with its variant spellings "Jadeite" and "Jade-ite," is still used somewhat interchangeably by collectors today, even though each historic manufacturer used its own distinct spelling.

Anchor Hocking, through its Fire-King ovenware brand, did not introduce jadeite-colored glassware until the mid-1940s, more than a decade after McKee and Jeannette, and called its version "Jade-ite," with a hyphen. The color's chemical composition differs subtly across manufacturers and even across individual production batches; because the formula was never standardized, pieces vary somewhat in hue, from pale seafoam to a deeper, more saturated green.

A related opaque blue milk glass was produced alongside jadeite by two of the three principal manufacturers. Jeannette marketed its version as "Delphite" (sometimes rendered "Delfite"), while Anchor Hocking's equivalent, introduced later, was called "Azur-ite." Collectors generally treat Delphite and Azur-ite as closely related but separate categories from jadeite proper.

== Anchor Hocking (Fire-King) ==
Anchor Hocking, through its Fire-King ovenware brand, became the most prolific and best-known producer of jadeite, despite being the last of the three principal manufacturers to enter the market. The company was formed in 1937 from the merger of the Hocking Glass Company and the Anchor Cap and Closure Corporation. Anchor Hocking introduced its first Fire-King Jade-ite dinnerware pattern, Alice, in 1945; the pattern was distributed as a promotional premium packed inside oatmeal boxes.

Anchor Hocking's Jade-ite color, like its competitors', was achieved by adding green glass cullet to a milk glass base, producing the characteristic batch-to-batch color variation collectors use to help date individual pieces. Critically, however, civilian uranium use was heavily restricted in the United States between 1942 and 1958 due to wartime and Cold War-era military demand; because Fire-King's production began after this restriction took effect, Fire-King Jade-ite contains no uranium and does not fluoresce under ultraviolet light, unlike the pre-war Jadite produced by McKee and Jeannette.

Anchor Hocking's Jade-ite line eventually encompassed a far broader range of dinnerware patterns than either of its competitors had attempted, including Restaurant Ware (a heavy, undecorated line marketed to diners, hospitals, and other commercial food-service establishments beginning around 1948), Jane Ray, Charm (the only square-format Jade-ite pattern), Sheaves of Wheat, and Shell. Anchor Hocking's Jade-ite sold more than 25 million pieces within its first six years of production and became, by the company's own account, its single best-selling product line. Restaurant Ware in particular became so closely associated with mid-century American diners that the color and the diner aesthetic are now largely inseparable in the popular imagination of the period.

Anchor Hocking also produced a pale blue counterpart it called "Azur-ite," analogous to Jeannette's earlier Delphite, though the two were never made by the same company and are not identical in either hue or composition.

Fire-King's original production run ended around 1976. In 2000, Anchor Hocking relaunched Jade-ite in a one-year commemorative series produced from new molds; pieces from this reissue are marked with a backstamp reading "Fire-King 2000" to distinguish them clearly from vintage production. A licensed Japanese manufacturer, Fire-King Japan, began producing new Jade-ite pieces under license beginning in 2010, using a combination of original American molds and new designs.

== McKee Glass Company ==
The McKee Glass Company was the first manufacturer to produce opaque jade-green kitchenware on a commercial scale. The company traced its roots to 1853, when it was founded in Pittsburgh as McKee and Brothers Glass Works; in 1888 it relocated to a Westmoreland County site that its founders developed into the town of Jeannette, Pennsylvania, named for the wife of one of the company's principals. After several reorganizations, the firm took the name McKee Glass Company in 1908.

McKee began producing opaque green glass kitchenware under the trade name "Skokie Green" in 1930. The color was renamed "Jade Green" in 1931 when the company began using it for its Laurel dinnerware line—McKee's only complete jadeite dinnerware pattern, also produced in companion shades the company called Seville Yellow, French Ivory, Chalaine Blue, and the later, paler Poudre Blue. Beyond Laurel, McKee's jadeite output consisted chiefly of kitchenware: mixing bowls, salt and pepper shakers, storage canisters, refrigerator dishes, and citrus reamers. McKee jadeite produced before the Second World War contains uranium oxide as a colorant and fluoresces under ultraviolet light, a characteristic shared with early Jeannette production and one that distinguishes both from the later, uranium-free Fire-King line. Marked pieces typically bear an "McK" within a circle.

In 1951, McKee was sold to the Thatcher Glass Manufacturing Company; a decade later, in 1961, its Jeannette plant was purchased by its longtime rival, the Jeannette Glass Company, which moved its own operations into the former McKee facility.

== Jeannette Glass Company ==
The Jeannette Glass Company began in 1887 as the Jeannette Bottle Works, a hand-blown bottle manufacturer in Jeannette, Pennsylvania; it adopted automated bottle-blowing machinery before the turn of the century and took the Jeannette Glass Company name around 1898. The firm became one of the first glassmakers to fully automate the production of colored pressed glass, allowing it to compete aggressively on price during the Great Depression, when it became one of the era's most prolific manufacturers of what collectors now call Depression glass.

Jeannette entered the opaque-green-glass market in 1932, two years after McKee, introducing kitchenware it marketed under the name "Jadite." Unlike McKee, Jeannette never produced a complete jadite dinnerware line; its output was concentrated in utilitarian kitchen items, including a wide range of canisters, mixing bowls, range shakers, and refrigerator dishes, and Jeannette's Jadite kitchenware line was, by volume, larger than its Delphite line. Jeannette's blue counterpart to Jadite, Delphite, was produced in smaller quantities and is correspondingly scarcer today. As with McKee, Jeannette's pre-war Jadite contains uranium oxide and will glow under UV light. Marked pieces are comparatively uncommon, since much of Jeannette's kitchenware left the factory without an embossed mark; where present, the mark generally takes the form of a "J" within a triangle.

Jeannette Glass became a publicly traded company in 1935 and continued producing glassware, including its jadite and Delphite lines, into the 1940s. In 1961, the company purchased the former McKee Glass plant, consolidating its operations there. Jeannette Glass became the Jeannette Corporation in 1970, reflecting its diversification, and the company ultimately closed in 1983.

== Heritage revival and modern production ==
Beyond the three principal manufacturers, other American glassmakers known for milk glass production, including Fenton and Westmoreland Glass, also produced jade-green and related opaque glass at various points across the twentieth century, contributing to what collectors now treat as a broader "family" of related colored glassware. Fenton, founded in 1905 and long associated with art and carnival glass, had introduced a translucent jade-green color for its No. 1700 Lincoln Inn dinnerware pattern by around 1929, predating the Depression-era boom at McKee and Jeannette by roughly a year.

The far larger surge in jadeite's popularity, however, began in the 1990s and is closely associated with Martha Stewart, who began prominently displaying her personal collection of vintage Jade-ite on her television program and in her magazine. Stewart subsequently released her own reproduction jadeite line through the Martha by Mail catalog beginning in the late 1990s; these pieces were manufactured under contract by established American glassmakers, including L. E. Smith, Fenton, and, later, Mosser Glass, using a combination of original vintage molds and newly designed shapes. The Martha by Mail releases used colorways that differ subtly from any of the three original manufacturers' formulations and are themselves now considered collectible.

Mosser Glass, founded in Cambridge, Ohio, by Thomas R. Mosser—whose father had managed the nearby Cambridge Glass Company before its 1954 closure—began producing pressed glass under its own name in 1971, after Thomas Mosser had worked independently in the glass trade since 1959. The company, still family-owned and operated by Thomas Mosser's children, is widely described as the last hand-pressed glass manufacturer operating in the United States, and jadeite remains among its best-selling colors. Mosser produces jadeite glassware using a combination of original molds acquired from earlier manufacturers, including Cambridge Glass, L. G. Wright, and Viking, alongside newly designed pieces.

Jadeite-colored glassware is also produced today by a range of importers and retail brands, manufactured overseas and sold through mass-market home goods retailers. These contemporary pieces are generally distinguished from vintage and heritage American production by weight, color saturation, and the absence of period-appropriate manufacturer's marks.

== Collecting and authentication ==
Collectors typically treat McKee, Jeannette, and Anchor Hocking as the three principal historic manufacturers of jadeite. A related but distinct category, clambroth glass, is more translucent than true opaque jadeite and is viewed ambivalently by purists; some collectors include it in their collections, while others do not consider it jadeite at all.

Because jadeite was inexpensive and mass-produced, surviving pieces vary enormously in value. Common kitchenware items from any of the three principal manufacturers can typically be found for a few dollars to a few tens of dollars, while rare forms—such as Anchor Hocking's spherical Jade-ite "ball jug," complete McKee Laurel place settings, or Jeannette Delphite kitchenware—can command several hundred dollars or more. A useful, if imperfect, method of distinguishing pre-war McKee and Jeannette jadeite from later Fire-King production is ultraviolet light: because of the uranium restrictions that took effect in the early 1940s, only the earlier glass will fluoresce.

Manufacturer's marks, where present, offer the most reliable means of identification: McKee pieces are typically marked "McK" within a circle, Jeannette pieces with a "J" within a triangle, and Anchor Hocking pieces with variations on its "Fire-King" or "Anchor Hocking" embossed marks. A substantial proportion of jadeite kitchenware, however, was sold unmarked, particularly smaller items and promotional pieces, which complicates identification for newer collectors and has led to a body of specialist reference literature, including Joe Keller and David Ross's Jadite: An Identification and Price Guide, widely regarded among collectors as a standard reference.

== See also ==
- Fire-King
- Anchor Hocking
- Depression glass
- Milk glass
- Uranium glass
- Pyrex
