= List of Witch Watch chapters =

Witch Watch is a Japanese manga series written and illustrated by Kenta Shinohara. The manga was serialized in Shueisha's shōnen manga magazine Weekly Shōnen Jump from February 8, 2021, to November 16, 2026. Shueisha has collected its chapters into individual tankōbon volumes. The first volume was released on June 4, 2021. As of October 2, 2026, twenty-eight volumes have been released.

Witch Watch has been licensed for simultaneous publication in North America as it is released in Japan, with its chapters being digitally launched by Viz Media on its Shonen Jump website. Shueisha also simulpublishes the series in English for free on the Manga Plus app and website. Viz Media also publishes its volumes in digital format.

== Volumes ==
No.	Original release date	Original ISBN	English release date	English ISBN
1	June 4, 2021	978-4-08-882696-7	February 22, 2022 (digital)	978-1-9747-3261-6
1. "Witch's Return" (魔女の帰還, Majo no Kikan); 2. "A Magical Duo" (マジカルな二人, Majikaru na Futari); 3. "A Giant Rookie" (大型ルーキー, Ōgata Rūkī); 4. "Let's Go to a Family Restaurant" (ファミレス行こ!, Famiresu Iko!); 5. "The Flying Classroom" (飛ぶ教室, Tobu Kyōshitsu); 6. "Fresh Transparent Fashions for Spring" (春のシースルーコーデ, Haru no Shīsurū Kōde); 7. "Witch's Delivery Service" (魔女に宅急便, Majo ni Takkyūbin)
When Morihito Otogi's childhood friend, Nico Wakatsuki, returns from her witch studies, she shatters a window while daydreaming but fixes it by sacrificing his valuable Fire-King mug. Her powerful spells tend to have unintended consequences: she flattens herself, but is wedged into a crack; Morihito breaks the wall down and she fixes it by sacrificing the local bully's hair. Morihito's father warns him that he must serve as Nico's familiar and save her from a disaster prophesized to take place within a year. When shopping together, they manage to rescue a woman from a fire using her magic; Nico declares she intends to become a great witch through altruistic deeds. Despite his admonitions, she admits to being a witch on her first day of class and meets two new friends. For the icebreaker, Nico takes the entire class outside for flying lessons, where they learn that Morihito has super strength because he is an ogre. At home, Nico tries to demonstrate modern outfits to catch his eye, but finds out that Morihito admires her antique linen dresses; he has niche interests in coffee and vintage fashion. Nico's manga collection arrives with a letter from her mother, warning Morihito about dogs and rain.
2	September 3, 2021	978-4-08-882764-3	May 24, 2022 (digital)	978-1-9747-3354-5
8. "Lost Dogs and the Patter of Rain" (迷子犬と雨のビート, Maigo Inu to Ame no Bīto); 9. "Kanshi Kazamatsuri, the Tengu" (天狗 – 風祭監志, Tengu – Kazamatsuri Kanshi); 10. "A Flying Demon" (天駆ける玄魔, Amakakeru Genma); 11. "A Friendly Scrum" (友情のスクラム, Yūjō no Sukuramu); 12. "Flutter Your Hair in the Hall" (渡り廊下でなびかせろ, Watarirōka de Nabikasero); 13. "My Student Is My Favorite Fan Artist" (教え子が推し絵師だった件, Oshiego ga Oshi Eshi Datta Ken); 14. "My Tummy Is Tender Today" (今日はヘビーなストマック, Kyō wa Hebī na Sutomakku); 15. "Cat Scout" (キャットスカウト, Kyatto Sukauto); 16. "Under the Lovers' Tree, Part 1" (縁結びの樹の下で 前編, Enmusubi no Ki no Shita de: Zenpen); 17. "Under the Lovers' Tree, Part 2" (縁結びの樹の下で 後編, Enmusubi no Ki no Shita de: Kōhen)
3	November 4, 2021	978-4-08-882842-8	August 23, 2022 (digital)	978-1-9747-3572-3
18. "Kanshi's Part-Time Job Diaries: The Superhero Show" (カンシのバイト日記～ヒーローショー～, Kanshi no Baito Nikki: Hīrō Shō); 19. "Dear Kara" (伽羅へ, Kara e); 20. "Kan & Nico's Channel" (カンニコチャンネル, Kan Niko Channeru); 21. "A Stray Cat's Bubble of Bliss" (通い猫の泡いひととき, Kayoi Neko no Awai Hitotoki); 22. "Dogs and Raindrops, Part 1" (犬と雨滴 – ①, Inu to Uteki – 1); 23. "Dogs and Raindrops, Part 2" (犬と雨滴 – ②, Inu to Uteki – 2); 24. "Dogs and Raindrops, Part 3" (犬と雨滴 – ③, Inu to Uteki – 3); 25. "Dogs and Raindrops, Part 4" (犬と雨滴 – ④, Inu to Uteki – 4); 26. "Dogs and Raindrops, Part 5" (犬と雨滴 – ⑤, Inu to Uteki – 5)
4	February 4, 2022	978-4-08-883011-7	November 22, 2022 (digital)	978-1-9747-3686-7
27. "Dogs and Raindrops: Part 6" (犬と雨滴 – ⑥, Inu to Uteki – 6); 28. "Dogs and Raindrops: Part 7" (犬と雨滴 – ⑦, Inu to Uteki – 7); 29. "Dogs and Raindrops: Part 8" (犬と雨滴 – ⑧, Inu to Uteki – 8); 30. "Keigo Magami, the Werewolf" (狼男 – 真神圭護, Ōkami Otoko – Magami Keigo); 31. "Release the Romance" (ときめきをときはなて, Tokimeki o Tokihanate); 32. "The Tea Ceremony Is a Piece of Tea Cake" (お茶の心はお茶の子さいさい, Ocha no Kokoro wa Ocha no Ko Saisai); 33. "Kind Tiger, Proud Wolf" (善人の虎高慢の狼, Zennin no Tora Kōman no Ōkami); 34. "Diary of My Favorite Artist" (推し絵師日誌, Oshi Eshi Nisshi); 35. "New Friends" (新しい友達, Atarashii Tomodachi)
5	April 4, 2022	978-4-08-883067-4	February 28, 2023 (digital)	978-1-9747-3788-8
36. "A Date with the Knight" (デート・ウィズ・ザ・ナイト, Dēto wizu za Naito); 37. "Kanshi's Part-Time Job Diaries: The Side Job" (カンシのバイト日記～内職ー～, Kanshi no Baito Nikki: Naishoku); 38. "A Trope-tacular Student Council" (ベタベタ生徒会, Betabeta Seitokai); 39. "The Student Council Introductions Video" (生徒会執行部紹介動画, Seitokai Shikkō-bu Shōkai Dōga); 40. "Please, Morihito Sensei" (お願いモリヒト先生, Onegai Morihito-sensei); 41. "I'm So Glad You're Here" (会えて嬉しい, Aete Ureshii); 42. "Summer Monsters, Part 1" (夏の魔物 – ①, Natsu no Mamono – 1); 43. "Summer Monsters, Part 2" (夏の魔物 – ②, Natsu no Mamono – 2); 44. "Summer Monsters, Part 3" (夏の魔物 – ③, Natsu no Mamono – 3)
6	June 3, 2022	978-4-08-883154-1	May 23, 2023 (digital)	978-1-9747-3940-0
45. "Miharu Kiryu, the Vampire" (吸血鬼 – 霧生見晴, Kyūketsuki – Kiryū Miharu); 46. "Box Body Boys"; 47. "The Creative Spark" (創作の火, Sōsaku no Hi); 48. "Uron Mirage Chapter 119: The Fuzzy Hunt, Part 4" (うろんミラージュ 第119話 ファジー討伐 – 4, Uron Mirāju Dai-Hyakujūkyū-wa: Fajī Tōbatsu – 4); 49. "Missing Parasol" (傘がない, Kasa ga Nai); 50. "Moi's Denim Devotion" (モイちゃんのデニム道, Moi-chan no Denimu-dō); 51. "A Freshman Witch and..." (駆け出し魔女と, Kakedashi Majo to); 52. "Her Familiars" (使い魔たち, Tsukaima-tachi); 53. "Peering into the Abyss of the Universe" (宇宙の深淵の黒い闇, Uchū no Shin'en no Kuroi Yami)
7	August 4, 2022	978-4-08-883221-0	August 22, 2023 (digital)	978-1-9747-4033-8
54. "Easy Spices for Enthralling Cooking" (お手軽超魅了, Otegaru Chōmiryō); 55. "We Got Trapped in a Death Game, But It Sucked" (デスゲーム挑まれたけどクソゲーだった, Desu Gēmu Idomareta kedo Kusogē datta); 56. "Student Council President for a Day" (一日生徒会長, Ichi Nichi Seito Kaichō); 57. "Kanshi's Part-Time Job Diaries: The Cafe" (カンシのバイト日記～カフェ～, Kanshi no Baito Nikki: Kafe); 58. "The Lost Wolf and the Stray Cat, Part 1" (迷い狼と通い猫 前編, Mayoi Ōkami to Kayoi Neko: Zenpen); 59. "The Lost Wolf and the Stray Cat, Part 2" (迷い狼と通い猫 後編, Mayoi Ōkami to Kayoi Neko: Kōhen); 60. "Scramble Scrap Squad" (スクランブル・スクラップ・スクワッド, Sukuranburu Sukurappu Sukuwaddo); 61. "Letter from a Friend, Part 1" (ともだちの手紙 前編, Tomodachi no Tegami: Zenpen); 62. "Letter from a Friend, Part 2" (ともだちの手紙 後編, Tomodachi no Tegami: Kōhen)
8	November 4, 2022	978-4-08-883388-0	November 28, 2023 (digital)	978-1-9747-4239-4
63. "Kara & Shiki" (カラちゃんとシキ, Kara-chan to Shiki); 64. "Mega Marble Mania Madness" (狂騒のビーダマニア, Kyōsō no Bīda Mania); 65. "Long Long a Go Go, Part 1" (LONG LONG A GO GO 前編, Rongu Rongu a Gō Gō: Zenpen); 66. "Long Long a Go Go, Part 2" (LONG LONG A GO GO 後編, Rongu Rongu a Gō Gō: Kōhen); 67. "Our First Offline Meetup" (はじめてのおふかい, Hajimete no Ofukai); 68. "Immersion War" (夢中戦争, Muchū Sensō); 69. "Mad Magic Making"; 70. "Secret Urges" (秘密の衝動, Himitsu no Shōdō); 71. "Lucky Birthday" (ラッキーバースデー, Rakkī Bāsudē)
9	January 4, 2023	978-4-08-883422-1	February 27, 2024 (digital)	978-1-9747-4478-7
72. "Magically Mighty Momochi" (魔力持ちモモチ, Chikara Mochi Momochi); 73. "While the Cat's Away, the Mice Will Play!" (3days Laundry); 74. "Jekyll Visits the Otogi House" (ジキルの乙木家訪問, Jikiru no Otogi-ke Hōmon); 75. "The Incredible Shrinking Adventure"; 76. "Moi's Denim Devotion, Part 2" (モイちゃんのデニム道Ⅱ, Moi-chan no Denimu-dō Tsū); 77. "The Hamazaki Fall Bread Festival" (ハマザキ秋のパンまつり, Hamazaki Aki no Pan Matsuri); 78. "Pajama Party" (パジャマパーティー, Pajama Pātī); 79. "Get a Geta!"; 80. "Fave Artist File Creative Surge" (オシエシニッシ執筆怒濤編, Oshieshi Nisshi Shippitsu Dotō-hen)
10	April 4, 2023	978-4-08-883454-2	May 28, 2024 (digital)	978-1-9747-4769-6
81. "Fave Artist File Crazy Events Arc" (オシエシニッシ波瀾会場編, Oshieshi Nisshi Haran Kaijō-hen); 82. "Autumn Storms, Part 1" (秋嵐 – ①, Shūran – 1); 83. "Autumn Storms, Part 2" (秋嵐 – ②, Shūran – 2); 84. "Autumn Storms, Part 3" (秋嵐 – ③, Shūran – 3); 85. "Autumn Storms, Part 4" (秋嵐 – ④, Shūran – 4); 86. "Autumn Storms, Part 5" (秋嵐 – ⑤, Shūran – 5); 87. "Keiko's Carefree Style" (ケイコの気ままスタイル, Keiko no Kimama Sutairu); 88. "Close My Eyes, and..." (目を閉じるとそこに君が, Me o Tojiru to Soko ni Kimi ga); 89. "A Lady of Sorrow" (憂いの淑女(レディ), Urei no Redi)
11	June 2, 2023	978-4-08-883559-4	August 27, 2024 (digital)	978-1-9747-4867-9
90. "Ogre Masters, Part 1" (OGRE MASTERS 前編, Ōga Masutāzu: Zenpen); 91. "Ogre Masters, Part 2" (OGRE MASTERS 後編, Ōga Masutāzu: Kōhen); 92. "Lock 'n' Rose"; 93. "Watchdog"; 94. "Kanshi's Part-Time Job Diaries: Ceremonial Occasions" (カンシのバイト日記～冠混葬祭～, Kanshi no Baito Nikki: Kankon Sōsai); 95. "Duet Dance, Part 1" (DUET DANCE 前編, Duetto Dansu: Zenpen); 96. "Duet Dance, Part 2" (DUET DANCE 後編, Duetto Dansu: Kōhen); 97. "Magic or Treat"; 98. "A Date with the Guide" (デート・ウィズ・ザ・ガイド, Dēto wizu za Gaido)
12	August 4, 2023	978-4-08-883593-8	November 26, 2024 (digital)	978-1-9747-5106-8
99. "My First Offline Meetup: My Big Friends' Adventure Special" (はじめてのおふかい～大きなおともだち大冒険スペシャル～, Hajimete no o Fukai: Ōkina o Tomodachi Daibōken Supesharu); 100. "Uron Mirage Chapter 171: The Mist Mission, Part 9" (うろんミラージュ 第171話 ミスト作戦 – 9, Uron Mirāju Dai-Hyaku-nanajūichi-wa: Misuto Sakusen – 9); 101. "Soft Nothings" (やわらかナーシング, Yawaraka Nāshingu); 102. "Secret Relationship" (秘密の関係, Himitsu no Kankei); 103. "Three Friends Behind the Gym" (体育館裏の三人, Taiikukan Ura no Sannin); 104. "Hard to Say I Love You"; 105. "I Honestly Just Wanna Joke" (素直にボケたくて, Sunao ni Boketakute); 106. "Operation: The Great Romancening!" (ドキドキドバドバ大作戦, Dokidoki Dobadoba Daisakusen); 107. "I've Always Loved Him" (ずっと好きなのよ, Zutto Suki nano yo)
13	October 4, 2023	978-4-08-883666-9	February 25, 2025 (digital)	978-1-9747-5382-6
108. "Collapse" (決壊, Kekkai); 109. "Missing Mistery" (ミスってるミステリー, Misutteru Misterī); 110. "The Student Kaiser Transformation Meeting" (生徒カイザー変身会議, Seito Kaizā Henshin Kaigi); 111. "Wacky Wednesday" (笑ってウェンズデー, Waratte Wenzudē); 112. "The Perfect Day for a Confession" (告白日和, Kokuhaku Biyori); 113. "To Be Alone with You" (二人きりになりたくて, Futarikiri ni Naritakute); 114. "The Day of the Disaster, Part 1" (災いの日 – ①, Wazawai no Hi – 1); 115. "The Day of the Disaster, Part 2" (災いの日 – ②, Wazawai no Hi – 2); 116. "The Day of the Disaster, Part 3" (災いの日 – ③, Wazawai no Hi – 3)
14	December 4, 2023	978-4-08-883787-1	May 27, 2025 (digital)	978-1-9747-5660-5
117. "The Day of the Disaster, Part 4" (災いの日 – ④, Wazawai no Hi – 4); 118. "The Day of the Disaster, Part 5" (災いの日 – ⑤, Wazawai no Hi – 5); 119. "The Day of the Disaster, Part 6" (災いの日 – ⑥, Wazawai no Hi – 6); 120. "The Day of the Disaster, Part 7" (災いの日 – ⑦, Wazawai no Hi – 7); 121. "The Day of the Disaster, Part 8" (災いの日 – ⑧, Wazawai no Hi – 8); 122. "The Day of the Disaster, Part 9" (災いの日 – ⑨, Wazawai no Hi – 9); 123. "The Day of the Disaster, Part 10" (災いの日 – ⑩, Wazawai no Hi – 10); 124. "The Day of the Disaster, Part 11" (災いの日 – ⑪, Wazawai no Hi – 11); 125. "The Day of the Disaster, Part 12" (災いの日 – ⑫, Wazawai no Hi – 12)
15	March 4, 2024	978-4-08-883818-2	August 26, 2025 (digital)	978-1-9747-5771-8
126. "The Day of the Disaster, Part 13" (災いの日 – ⑬, Wazawai no Hi – 13); 127. "The Day of the Disaster, Part 14" (災いの日 – ⑭, Wazawai no Hi – 14); 128. "The Day of the Disaster, Part 15" (災いの日 – ⑮, Wazawai no Hi – 15); 129. "The Day of the Disaster, Part 16" (災いの日 – ⑯, Wazawai no Hi – 16); 130. "The Day of the Disaster, Part 17" (災いの日 – ⑰, Wazawai no Hi – 17); 131. "The Day of the Disaster, Part 18" (災いの日 – ⑱, Wazawai no Hi – 18); 132. "The Start of the New Life" (新生活スタート, Shin seikatsu Sutāto); 133. "Call Me by My Name"; 134. "Kindergarteners Are Light on Their Feet" (浮足立つ園児たち, Ukiashidatsu Enji-tachi)
16	April 4, 2024	978-4-08-883877-9	November 25, 2025 (digital)	978-1-9747-5872-2
135. "Familiar Summoning Committee" (使い魔サモン委員会, Tsukai ma Samon Iinkai); 136. "Ban the Dragon" (龍 – バン, Ryū – Ban); 137. "King for a Day" (王様になれ, Ōsama ni Nare); 138. "Role Model" (ロールモデル, Rōru Moderu); 139. "A Fruity Game" (イカすゲーム, Ika su Gēmu); 140. "Meeting the True You" (素顔の君に会いたくて, Sugao no Kimi ni Aitakute); 141. "Santa Claus Fantasy, Part 1" (サンタクロース・ファンタジー 前編, Santa Kurōsu Fantajī: Zenpen); 142. "Santa Claus Fantasy, Part 2" (サンタクロース・ファンタジー 後編, Santa Kurōsu Fantajī: Kōhen); 143. "Drinking in the New Year" (Have a luck belongs to the good day and good day)
17	July 4, 2024	978-4-08-884112-0	February 24, 2026 (digital)	978-1-9747-6424-2
144. "New Year's Short Stories" (お正月ショートショート, Oshōgatsu Shōtoshōto); 145. "Enman-Another Story" (演漫アナザーストーリー, Enman Anazā Sutōrī); 146. "Nico in Wonderland" (不思議の国のニコ, Fushigi no kuni no Niko); 147. "I Am a Blade" (アタシは刃, Atashi wa ha); 148. "Four-Panel Days" (4コマの日々, Yonkoma no Hibi); 149. "Through Sun or Snow I Go" (会いに行き雪て, Ai ni Iki Yukite); 150. "Chocolate Party" (チョコレートパーティー, Chokorēto Pātī); 151. "Punctual Man"; 152. "Monster Parents" (モンスターペアレンツ, Monsutā Pearentsu)
18	September 4, 2024	978-4-08-884170-0	May 26, 2026 (digital)	978-1-9747-6899-8
153. "Momochi's Feelings" (モモチの気持ち, Momochi no Kimochi); 154. "How We Found What We'd Lost Inside" (心を取り戻すボクたちの物語, Kokoro o Torimodosu Bokutachi no Monogatari); 155. "Kids' Show Drama" (泥沼キッズショー, Doronuma Kizzu Shō); 156. "A Legendary Speech" (伝説の答辞, Densetsu no Tōji); 157. "Fire Girl Fever"; 158. "School Preparation Factory" (入学準備ファクトリー, Nyūgaku Junbi Fakutorī); 159. "The New School Year"; 160. "The 2nd Kiyomiya Student Council Executive Committee" (第2次清宮生徒会執行部, Dai-ni-ji Seimiya Seito-kai Shikkō-bu); 161. "Adhesive Adventure"
19	November 1, 2024	978-4-08-884251-6	August 25, 2026 (digital)	978-1-9747-6900-1
162. "#simpleliving" (#シンプルライフ, Shinpuru Raifu); 163. "Textbook Love" (恋は教科書のように, Koi wa Kyōkasho no yō ni); 164. "The Birthday Present King" (誕プレ王決定戦, Tanpure-ō Kettei-sen); 165. "Stuck-On Smile" (貼り付けた笑顔, Haritsuketa Egao); 166. "Class 1-2's Newsletter Team" (1年2組新聞係, 1-nen 2-kumi Shinbun-gakari); 167. "Enter the Animation"; 168. "Chami's Secret" (秘密のチャミー, Himitsu no Chamī); 169. "The Secret Chami" (チャミーの秘密, Chamī no Himitsu); 170. "Nico's Kanshi and Kanshi's Nico" (ニコがカンシでカンシがニコで, Niko ga Kanshi de Kanshi ga Niko de)
20	January 4, 2025	978-4-08-884398-8	—	—
171. "Morihito's Vintage Devotion" (モイちゃんのヴィンテージ道, Moi-chan no Vintēji Dō); 172. "Dark Dank & Delicious Devilishly Good Cooking" (ヤムヤムヤミーの小悪魔クッキング, Yamuyamu Yamī no ko Akuma Kukkingu); 173. "Kurowa, Moving On" (進めクロワッサン, Susume Kurowassan); 174. "Sneeze Explosion"; 175. "High-class Haiku Class"; 176. "A Cat and Wolf's Waltz" (猫と狼の円舞曲, Neko to Ōkami no Enbukyoku); 177. "Get Rich Quick! An Easy Primer on X-Ray Vision" (稼ぐ! かんたん透視入門, Kasegu! Kantan Tōshi Nyūmon); 178. "The Troubles Kuon Shiranui Only Knows" (不知火久遠しか知らない苦悩, Shiranui Kuon Shika Shiranai Kunō); 179. "Phantom Blaze, Part 1" (PHANTOM BLAZE ①)
21	April 4, 2025	978-4-08-884450-3	—	—
180. "Phantom Blaze, Part 2" (PHANTOM BLAZE ②); 181. "Phantom Blaze, Part 3" (PHANTOM BLAZE ③); 182. "Phantom Blaze, Part 4" (PHANTOM BLAZE ④); 183. "Phantom Blaze, Part 5" (PHANTOM BLAZE ⑤); 184. "Phantom Blaze, Part 6" (PHANTOM BLAZE ⑥); 185. "Phantom Blaze, Part 7" (PHANTOM BLAZE ⑦); 186. "Do Me a Big Favor" (大きなお世話するのよ, Ōkina Osewa suru no yo); 187. "A Home Resort Vacation" (お家リゾート, Oie Rizōto); 188. "A T-Shirt Kind of Guy" (Tな奴ら, Tna Yatsura)
22	July 4, 2025	978-4-08-884565-4	—	—
189. "Haimi's Road to Manga Creation" (ハイミのまんが道, Haimi no Manga Michi); 190. "Familiar Sitter"; 191. "Momotaro (& Company)" (桃太郎 （を始めとした一行）, Momotarō (o Hajime to Shita Ikkō)); 192. "Cat & Wolf's Rondo, Part 1" (猫と狼の輪舞曲 前編, Neko to Ōkami no Rondo Zenpen); 193. "Cat & Wolf's Rondo, Part 2" (猫と狼の輪舞曲 後編, Neko to Ōkami no Rondo Kōhen); 194. "Student Council Recruitment" (生徒会リクルートメント, Seitokai Rikurūtomento); 195. "A Birthday Mix-Up" (神違いバースデー, Kami Chigai Bāsudē); 196. "Hybrid Rainbow" (ハイブリッド レインボウ, Haiburiddo Reinbō); 197. "Dent's Traffic-Safety Lesson" (ジーコの交通安全教室, Jīko no Kōtsū Anzen Kyōshitsu)
23	September 4, 2025	978-4-08-884651-4	—	—
198. "Unique Sneak"; 199. "Bringing Down the Fist of Rage Upon the Dragon" (ドラゴンに怒りの鉄拳, Doragon ni Ikari no Tekken); 200. "That Time My Childhood Friend Had Trouble Getting 34 Spells Back, but They All Sucked" (幼馴染の魔女が返してもらえない34個の魔法が全部ザコ魔法だった件, Osananajimi no Majo ga Kaeshite Moraenai 34-ko no Mahō ga Zenbu Zako Mahōdatta Kudan); 201. "A Sensitive Age" (多感な年頃だから, Takan na Toshigoro Dakara); 202. "Yep, It's Love" (やっぱり恋なんだ, Yappari Koina nda); 203. "Under Cover"; 204. "Locked in Misstep" (調子くズレな二人, Chōshi ku Zurena Futari); 205. "Glimpses of Bodyguards" (チラ見えボディーガード, Chirami e Bodīgādo); 206. "Happy Go Cookie"; 207. "Make Up! Shake Up!"
24	December 4, 2025	978-4-08-884808-2	—	—
208. "Moi's Sticker Collection" (モイちゃんのシールコレクション, Moi-chan no Shīru Korekushon); 209. "The Great River Crossing Problem" (川渡り大問題, Kawatari dai Mondai); 210. "Ad-dorably Mighty Girl" (CMガール, CM Gāru); 211. "Kan-toon" (カートゥーン, Kātoūn); 212. "Childhood's End, Part 1" (幼年期の終わり 前編, Yōnenki no Owari Zenpen); 213. "Childhood's End, Part 2" (幼年期の終わり 後編, Yōnenki no Owari Kōhen); 214. "A Bachelor Pad Smells of Trouble" (男所帯は危険な香り, Otoko Jotai wa Kiken'na Kaori); 215. "The Student Council Succession Saga, Part 1" (生徒会サクセション 前編, Seitokai Sakuseshon Zenpen); 216. "The Student Council Succession Saga, Part 2" (生徒会サクセション 後編, Seitokai Sakuseshon Kōhen)
25	March 4, 2026	978-4-08-884868-6	—	—
217. "Romantic Fantasia" (ロマンティック・ファンタジア, Romantikku Fantajia); 218. "Cat and Wolf's Fugue" (猫と狼の遁走曲, Neko to Ōkami no Tonsō Kyoku); 219. "The Always-Useful Kanshi Texting Sticker" (【ずっと使える】スタンプになったカンシ スタンプ, [Zutto Tsukaeru] Sutanpu ni Natta kan shi Sutanpu); 220. "Fired Up for a Foodie Broadcast" (燃えろ! グルメ中継, Moero! Gurume Chūkei); 221. "A Box That Is Blue" (アオいハコ, Aoi Hako); 222. "Crash Through"; 223. "Finally Said" (やっと言えた, Yatto Ieta); 224. "The Scent of Romance" (恋の香り, Koi no Kaori); 225. "The Stream Before the Storm"
26	June 4, 2026	978-4-08-885036-8	—	—
226. "The Seven Warlocks" (7人の黒魔女, Nana-ri no Kuro Majo); 227. "The Insider"; 228. "Special Offer" (契約特典, Keiyaku Tokuten); 229. "Summit at the Food Court" (フードコートサミット, Fūdo Kōto Samitto); 230. "Pairing Planning"; 231. "ZERO HOUR"; 232. "BONE CRISIS-①"; 233. "BONE CRISIS-②"; 234. "BONE CRISIS-③"
27	August 4, 2026	978-4-08-885134-1	—	—
235. "BONE CRISIS-④"; 236. "BONE CRISIS-⑤"; 237. "BONE CRISIS-⑥"; 238. "BONE CRISIS-⑦"; 239. "BONE CRISIS-⑧"; 240. "BONE CRISIS-⑨"; 241. "BONE CRISIS-⑩"; 242. "BONE CRISIS-⑪"; 243. "BONE CRISIS-⑫"
28	October 2, 2026	978-4-08-885201-0	—	—
244. "BONE CRISIS-⑬"; 245. "BONE CRISIS-⑭"; 246. "BONE CRISIS-⑮"; 247. "BONE CRISIS-⑯"; 248. "BONE CRISIS-⑰"; 249. "BONE CRISIS-⑱"; 250. "BONE CRISIS-⑲"; 251. "BONE CRISIS-⑳"; 252. "BONE CRISIS-㉑"; 253. "BONE CRISIS-㉒"

=== Chapters not yet in tankōbon format ===
These chapters have yet to be published in a tankōbon volume.

254. "BONE CRISIS-㉓"
255. "Bone Crisis, Part 24 ~Memories of Roswitha, Part 1~" (BONE CRISIS-㉔ 追憶のロスヴィータ〜前編〜, BONE CRISIS-㉔ Tsuioku no Rosuvīta 〜Zenpen〜)
256. "Bone Crisis, Part 25 ~Memories of Roswitha, Part 2~" (BONE CRISIS-㉕ 追憶のロスヴィータ〜後編〜, BONE CRISIS-㉕ Tsuioku no Rosuvīta 〜Kōhen〜)
257. "BONE CRISIS-㉖"
258. "BONE CRISIS-㉗"
259. "BONE CRISIS-㉘"
260. "BONE CRISIS-㉙"
261. "BONE CRISIS-㉚"
262. "REBORN CRISIS-①"
263. "REBORN CRISIS-②"
264. "REBORN CRISIS-③"
265. "REBORN CRISIS-④"
266. "REBORN CRISIS-⑤"
267. "REBORN CRISIS-⑥"
268. "REBORN CRISIS-⑦"
269. "REBORN CRISIS-⑧"
270. "Watch Me!"
