= Paradisical =

American-bred Thoroughbred racehorse

- Sire: In Memoriam
- Grandsire: McGee
- Dam: Madrigal
- Damsire: Maintenon
- Sex: Filly
- Foaled: 1932
- Country: United States
- Colour: Bay
- Breeder: Wood F. Axton
- Owner: 1) Wood F. Axton 2) Isaac J. Collins
- Trainer: Al Miller
- Record: 103: 29-19-18
- Earnings: US$39,210

Major wins
- Kentucky Oaks (1935); Ohio Derby (1935); Carnival Purse (1935); Crab Orchard Purse (1935); Pontchartrain Handicap (1935); Regret Purse (1935); Christmas Handicap (1936); Cadillac Handicap (1937); De La Salle Handicap (1937)

Paradisical (foaled in 1932) was an American Thoroughbred racehorse best known for winning the 1935 Kentucky Oaks and for then setting a new Thistledown Racecourse track record in beating colts in the Ohio Derby.

Bred and raced by Louisville, Kentucky tobacco manufacturer Wood F. Axton, Paradisical was sired by In Memoriam, the American Co-Champion Three-Year-Old Colt of 1923. Her dam was Madrigal, a daughter of the brilliant French Champion Maintenon who was owned by American William Vanderbilt.

Wood Axton never got to see Paradisical's success. The filly was sold in early May, 1935 by his estate following his death. His new owner was Isaac J. Collins, founder of Hocking Glass Co. in Lancaster, Ohio.
