= Fire King (disambiguation) =

Fire King may refer to:

- Fire King (video game), 1989
- Fire King, one of the GWR 3031 Class locomotives that ran on the Great Western Railway between 1891 and 1915
- Fire King, alternative name of The King of Blaze (manhua), 1990s Taiwanese comic book
- Fire-King, American glassware brand
