= Isaac J. Collins =

American businessman (1874-1975)

- Born: Isaac Jacob Collins; October 27, 1874; Salisbury, Maryland
- Died: October 22, 1975 (aged 100); Lancaster, Ohio
- Occupations: Businessman, Racehorse owner
- Known for: Founder: Anchor Hocking Corp.
- Political party: Republican
- Board member of: Anchor Hocking Corp., Ohio Racing Commission

Isaac Jacob Collins (October 27, 1874 – October 22, 1975) was an American businessman who founded the Anchor Hocking Corp.

Born in Salisbury, Maryland, as a young man Isaac Collins moved to Lancaster, Ohio to work as a decorator at a pressed glass manufacturing company. There, he founded the Hocking Glass Company in 1905 which became the Anchor Hocking Corp. following a 1937 merger with the Anchor Cap Co. Collins served as president of the new Anchor Hocking and in 1944 was appointed chairman of the board of directors.

Isaac Collins owned Fairfield Stock Farm near Lancaster from which he raised both Thoroughbred and Standardbred horses. Among his successful Thoroughbreds were the filly Paradisical whose wins included the 1935 Kentucky Oaks and the Ohio Derby against males, and the colt Vulcan's Forge who won the 1949 the Santa Anita and Suburban Handicaps.

Collins was appointed to the Ohio Racing Commission in 1933 and later was named its chairman. He stepped down in 1947. In the 1960s, he was an officer of Balmoral Harness Racing, Inc.

Isaac Collins died at his home in Lancaster, Ohio five days shy of his 101st birthday.
