= Fire-King =

Brand of ovenware glassware produced by Anchor Hocking

- Country: United States
- Introduced: 1942
- Discontinued: 1976 (original production); 2000 (limited reissue)
- Related brands: Pyrex, Jadeite (kitchenware)
- Markets: United States (and globally through licensed manufacturers)
- Website: anchorhocking.com

Fire-King is a brand of heat-resistant ovenware and dinnerware produced by Anchor Hocking of Lancaster, Ohio. Introduced in 1942, the line was manufactured continuously for more than three decades, becoming one of the most widely distributed brands of everyday glassware in mid-twentieth-century America. Fire-King was sold through grocery stores, hardware stores, and five-and-dime shops, and was frequently given away as a promotional premium with purchases of flour, oatmeal, or gasoline. Production of the original line ended in 1976, and a limited commemorative reissue was produced in 1992. Anchor Hocking relaunched the Jade-ite pattern in 2000, and a licensed Japanese manufacturer, Fire-King Japan Co., Ltd., began producing borosilicate Fire-King pieces in 2010.

Fire-King is best known for its Jade-ite line, an opaque jade-green milk glass that became a staple of American diners and home kitchens from the late 1940s through the 1960s. The brand also produced glassware in a wide range of other colors and decorative patterns, including Peach Lustre, Turquoise Blue, Azur-ite, Rose-ite, and dozens of decaled white glass patterns. Vintage Fire-King has attracted a devoted collector base, and interest in the line surged beginning in the 1990s after Martha Stewart publicly showcased her collection of Jade-ite on her television program and in her magazine.

== Background ==
Fire-King was a product of the Anchor Hocking Glass Corporation, which had its origins in the Hocking Glass Company, founded in 1905 by Isaac J. Collins in Lancaster, Ohio, and named for the nearby Hocking River. Collins and his associates purchased an old carbon plant known locally as "the Black Cat" for its carbon-blackened walls, incorporated the company with approximately $25,000 in startup capital, and melted their first glass in February 1906. The company grew steadily through the 1910s and 1920s, introducing its first line of pressed glass dinnerware in 1928 and adopting automated pressing machinery that dramatically increased output while reducing costs.

A disastrous fire destroyed the original Lancaster plant in March 1924, throwing approximately 650 workers out of work overnight, but Hocking Glass rebuilt rapidly, purchasing controlling interest in the Lancaster Glass Company the following month to maintain production. By 1929, the company had introduced a 15-mold automated machine capable of producing 90 blown glass pieces per minute, helping it survive the Great Depression by supplying affordable glassware at prices competitive with any on the market.

On December 31, 1937, the Hocking Glass Company merged with the Anchor Cap and Closure Corporation—a manufacturer of bottle closures headquartered in Long Island City, New York, whose name derived from the phrase that caps "were anchored for safety"—to form the Anchor Hocking Glass Corporation. The newly combined company expanded into tableware, ovenware, and other consumer glass products. By 1947, Forbes magazine had devoted its entire 30th Anniversary issue to Lancaster, Ohio, citing Anchor Hocking as the backbone of what it called the ideal American town. By 1950, Anchor Hocking employed approximately 10,000 people and ranked as one of the world's largest glass manufacturers.

In 1969, the company changed its name to Anchor Hocking Corporation, reflecting its diversification into plastics and other non-glass products. In 1987, the Newell Company acquired Anchor Hocking in a hostile takeover; the new owners fired the existing executive team and closed the headquarters, severing the close ties between corporate leadership and the Lancaster community that had defined the company for eight decades. The acquisition by Newell and subsequent ownership changes—including a sale to Global Home Products in 2004, a bankruptcy proceeding in 2006, and a purchase by Monomoy Capital Partners in 2007—form the subject of Brian Alexander's 2017 book Glass House: The 1% Economy and the Shattering of the All-American Town.

== History ==
=== Origins and wartime context (1941–1945) ===
The "Fire-King" name was registered as a federal trademark on June 24, 1941. The line debuted in 1942, at a moment when the demands of World War II had created acute shortages of the metal traditionally used to manufacture kitchen bakeware. With steel, aluminum, and iron reserved for military production—planes, tanks, ships, and munitions—civilian cookware had become difficult to obtain. Anchor Hocking's answer was a line of heat-resistant glass ovenware that could replace metal in the kitchen: it could go from the refrigerator to the oven without cracking, from the oven to the table for serving, and could be cleaned and stored alongside other dishware.

The first Fire-King was produced in a pale, transparent blue known as Sapphire Blue, decorated with a pressed scrollwork pattern. It was marketed as Fire-King Oven Glass and appeared in an advertisement in Good Housekeeping in October 1942—the earliest known advertising for the brand. The Sapphire Blue line remained in production until approximately 1945, after which it was gradually phased out in favor of opaque milk glass and the Jade-ite color that would define the brand's most celebrated era.

=== The Jade-ite era (1945–1963) ===
In 1945, Anchor Hocking introduced the first Fire-King Jade-ite dinnerware pattern, known as Alice, an embossed floral-border design that was distributed as a premium packed inside oatmeal boxes. The Jade-ite color—a dense, opaque green milk glass achieved by adding green glass cullet (recycled bottle glass scraps) to a milk glass base—was Anchor Hocking's contribution to a category of green glass kitchenware that two other Pennsylvania manufacturers, McKee Glass Company and Jeannette Glass Company, had pioneered beginning around 1930. McKee had introduced their version under the name "Skokie green" in 1930, and Jeannette had coined the term "Jadite" in 1932; Anchor Hocking's own spelling, "Jade-ite," became the most widely recognized.

The production process imparted the color's characteristic variation: because different amounts of green cullet were used in different batches, pieces vary slightly in hue from pale seafoam to a deeper celadon, and manufacturing swirls are common within individual pieces. Unlike the Jade-ite produced earlier by McKee and Jeannette, which contained uranium oxide as a colorant and glowed under ultraviolet light, Fire-King Jade-ite contains no uranium. Civilian use of uranium was heavily restricted between 1942 and 1958 due to wartime and postwar military priorities, so Anchor Hocking relied entirely on recycled glass for its green color.

By the late 1940s, Anchor Hocking was marketing Jade-ite to commercial food-service establishments as well as home consumers. The Restaurant Ware line—heavier and thicker than pieces intended for home use—was pitched as the lowest-priced tableware service on the market, underselling conventional vitrified china by approximately fifty percent. A 1950 advertisement in the Lancaster Eagle-Gazette described it as "heat-proof, stain-proof, non-absorbent, sanitary, easy to clean and keep clean," making it ideal for restaurants, cafeterias, hospital dining rooms, hotel coffee shops, and institutional kitchens. The line became Fire-King's best-selling Jade-ite product, and the sight of jade-green mugs and plates in American diners became so commonplace by the 1950s that the color and the diner aesthetic are virtually inseparable in the popular imagination of the period.

Anchor Hocking's Jade-ite line sold more than 25 million pieces within its first six years of production.

=== Expansion and the mid-century peak (1948–1965) ===
Through the late 1940s and 1950s, Fire-King expanded far beyond Jade-ite to encompass a broad range of colors, patterns, and product types. The brand introduced Restaurant Ware for institutional use beginning around 1948, a thick, durable version of Jade-ite designed for commercial kitchens. Anchor Hocking also made Fire-King for the U.S. military and other institutional buyers from 1948 until 1967.

Peach Lustre, introduced in 1952, applied a fired-on iridescent overglaze to pressed glass, producing a warm amber-pink finish with a mirror-like quality. The Laurel pattern (also known as Sheaves of Wheat) in Peach Lustre became one of the most recognizable Fire-King designs of the postwar era. Peach Lustre was produced until approximately 1963 and appeared in multiple embossed patterns including Swirl, Shell, and Three Bands. The iridescent overglaze made these pieces somewhat more fragile than solid-glass Fire-King, and well-preserved sets are comparatively scarce today.

In the mid-1950s, Anchor Hocking introduced Turquoise Blue (c. 1956–1962), a vivid opaque teal glass that appeared primarily in the Swirl and Charm patterns. Azur-ite, a lighter and paler blue, followed in the early 1960s. Rose-ite, a creamy opaque pink, and Burgundy, a deep wine color, rounded out the range of solid opaque colors. The company also produced Ivory, Ivory-White, and standard White milk glass, which served as the base for the brand's extensive line of decorated patterns.

The late 1950s saw Anchor Hocking pursue commercial partnerships. In a notable arrangement, the Sealtest dairy company commissioned Fire-King to produce milk-glass cottage cheese bowls decorated with tulip graphics, which were included with Sealtest Cottage Cheese purchases. Branded promotional mugs featuring restaurant logos and commercial characters were produced in large numbers and have become a distinct collector sub-category in their own right.

=== Decline and discontinuation (1965–1976) ===
By the mid-1960s, the American market for functional ovenware had shifted significantly. Plastic storage containers, most notably Tupperware (introduced to the consumer market in the late 1940s), and new lines of enameled cookware and tempered-glass competitors had reduced the functional advantage that had originally made Fire-King indispensable. Anchor Hocking continued producing Fire-King in new patterns and colors through the late 1960s and early 1970s, including the Shell pattern (1965–1976) and decorative white-glass lines such as Meadow Green, but the category was contracting.

The original Fire-King line was discontinued around 1976. In 1992, on the occasion of the brand's fiftieth anniversary, Anchor Hocking produced a limited commemorative run of Fire-King pieces. The anniversary items have since become modestly collectible in their own right.

=== Revival and the collector era (1992–present) ===
The transformation of Fire-King from discarded kitchenware into a serious collector's category began gradually during the 1980s and accelerated sharply in the 1990s. A key catalyst was Martha Stewart, who began prominently displaying her collection of vintage Jade-ite on her television program Martha Stewart Living and in the pages of her magazine. Stewart's daughter, Alexis, had begun collecting Jade-ite on a cross-country road trip in the 1990s, and much of that collection eventually came to reside in Stewart's home in Maine. As Stewart's on-screen kitchen became an aspirational touchstone for a generation of home-decorating enthusiasts, Jade-ite's profile rose dramatically. National news coverage followed, reporting that the everyday green dishes from grandmother's cupboard had become valuable collectibles. Pieces that had languished in thrift stores were swept up and listed on eBay—then a new and rapidly growing online marketplace—at prices many times their former value.

Stewart further amplified this market by launching her own jadeite reproduction line through the Martha by Mail catalog in the late 1990s, produced primarily by Mosser Glass of Cambridge, Ohio, and L.E. Smith Glass. The Martha by Mail line used slightly different colorways than original Fire-King and is itself now considered collectible. Some longtime collectors viewed the reproduction market with ambivalence, noting that it complicated identification for newer buyers and drove up prices on original pieces; others welcomed the renewed attention.

In 2000, Anchor Hocking responded to the demand by relaunching Fire-King Jade-ite in a commemorative series. The 2000 reissue was produced from new molds and is clearly distinguished from vintage pieces by a backstamp reading "ANCHOR HOCKING [logo] Fire-King 2000." Some pieces in the 2000 line were "fantasy items"—shapes that had never been produced during the original production run—while others were faithful reproductions of vintage patterns. Anchor Hocking designed the markings specifically to prevent confusion with authentic vintage pieces. The 2000 series was only produced that single year, and those pieces have themselves grown in collector value in the decades since.

When Martha Stewart sold a portion of her Jade-ite collection at a tag sale in 2022, the event attracted considerable attention: reported buyers included Blake Lively and Kris Jenner, with Jenner reportedly flying in an assistant specifically to secure a particular rare piece.

On December 21, 2010, Fire-King Japan Co., Ltd. was founded in Japan, opening to the public in Tokyo in 2011. By 2010 Fire-King Japan had become the exclusive manufacturer of new Fire-King products, producing pieces in borosilicate glass and combining vintage American molds with Japanese glassworking traditions. The Japanese line is available in Jade-ite, Rose-ite, milk glass, and other colors, and has produced decal collaborations with brands including Disney and Mos Burger.

== Glass composition ==
Original Fire-King glassware was produced primarily from low-expansion borosilicate glass, a formulation that resists thermal shock and allows pieces to move from a cold refrigerator into a hot oven without cracking. This property was essential to Fire-King's core marketing proposition as practical, go-anywhere ovenware. Over the course of the production run, however, not all Fire-King was borosilicate; some later pieces, particularly those in the decorative dinnerware lines introduced in the 1960s and 1970s, were made from tempered soda-lime-silicate glass, which has greater mechanical strength against dropping but is more vulnerable to thermal shock. Current American-market Fire-King (produced since the 2000 reissue) is made of tempered soda-lime glass; Fire-King Japan produces its pieces in borosilicate.

Jade-ite's color derives from the addition of recycled green glass cullet—primarily from used beverage bottles—to a standard milk glass base. The imprecision of this process accounts for the slight color variation between individual pieces and production batches, a characteristic that experienced collectors use both to date pieces and to assess authenticity. Unlike contemporaneous green glass from McKee and Jeannette, Fire-King Jade-ite contains no uranium and does not fluoresce under ultraviolet light.

Peach Lustre and similar iridescent fired-on colors were achieved by applying a metallic oxide overglaze to the pressed glass surface and then firing it at high temperature to bond the coating permanently. The process created the characteristic iridescent shimmer but also made the surface more susceptible to scratching and dulling; Anchor Hocking consistently recommended hand-washing for all Fire-King pieces, a recommendation that applies equally to decorated white glass, where dishwasher detergent can etch or strip fired-on decals.

== Production marks and dating ==
Authentic vintage Fire-King is marked on the underside of each piece with raised (embossed) text molded directly into the glass. The format of these marks changed at several points during the production run and can be used to date individual pieces with reasonable precision:

- 1942–1952: "FIRE-KING" with a hyphen, typically accompanied by "OVEN WARE" or "OVEN GLASS." Earliest pieces may read only "MADE IN USA." Some early transparent blue (Sapphire Blue) pieces are unmarked.
- 1952–1962: "FIRE KING OVEN WARE" without a hyphen; pattern names are sometimes added (e.g., "JANE RAY," "ALICE").
- 1962–1976: "ANCHOR HOCKING" added above "FIRE-KING" in most marks; some pieces read "ANCHOR HOCKING FIRE-KING OVEN WARE" across two or three lines.

Some pieces—particularly Jade-ite items produced under promotional or commercial contracts—carry no embossed mark and were identified only by a paper foil sticker, which has often been lost. These unmarked pieces are identified by color, weight, pattern comparison, and glass texture. Pieces from the 2000 reissue are clearly stamped with the year, and Fire-King Japan pieces carry their own distinct markings.

The Anchor Hocking mark itself—an anchor with an "H" inside it—appears on many Fire-King pieces but is occasionally confused with the Hazel Atlas mark, which features an "H" with an "A" beneath the bar.

== Visual timeline ==
Fire-King production timeline
Year	Event
1941	"Fire-King" name registered as a federal trademark (June 24, 1941).
1942	Brand launches; first Fire-King produced in Sapphire Blue (transparent pale blue). Advertised in Good Housekeeping, October 1942.
1945	Jade-ite introduced. Alice pattern debuted as the first Jade-ite dinnerware, distributed as a premium in oatmeal boxes.
c. 1948	Restaurant Ware line introduced for commercial and institutional use. Jane Ray pattern in Jade-ite begins production.
1950	Anchor Hocking employs approximately 10,000 workers; ranks as one of the world's largest glass manufacturers.
1952	Peach Lustre introduced. Laurel (Sheaves of Wheat) pattern in Jade-ite and Peach Lustre begins production (–1963).
c. 1956	Turquoise Blue introduced; Charm pattern (square-shaped pieces) produced in Turquoise Blue and Jade-ite.
c. 1957–1959	Sheaves of Wheat Jade-ite pattern produced; one of the shortest production runs and among the most collected.
c. 1960s	Azur-ite (pale blue opaque), Rose-ite (creamy pink), and Burgundy produced. White milk glass with decaled patterns becomes dominant.
1965	Shell pattern introduced (–1976), produced in Jade-ite, Peach Lustre, and Turquoise Blue.
1976	Original Fire-King production ends.
1987	Anchor Hocking acquired by the Newell Company in a hostile takeover.
1992	Anchor Hocking produces a limited commemorative run for the brand's 50th anniversary.
Late 1990s	Martha Stewart showcases her Jade-ite collection on Martha Stewart Living; collector market accelerates sharply. Martha by Mail launches jadeite reproduction line.
2000	Anchor Hocking relaunches Jade-ite in a commemorative series with new molds, marked "Fire-King 2000." Produced for one year only.
2010 (Dec. 21)	Fire-King Japan Co., Ltd. founded; opens to the public in Tokyo in 2011.

== Colors and patterns ==
Fire-King glassware falls into several broad categories defined by glass type, color, and decorative treatment.

=== Jade-ite ===
Jade-ite is the most celebrated and widely collected Fire-King product. Produced from 1945 to approximately 1976 (with Restaurant Ware beginning around 1948 and running through the mid-1960s), it is an opaque, milky jade-green glass whose color varies slightly from piece to piece due to the variable proportion of recycled green glass used in the batch.

Jade-ite production spanned multiple distinct patterns, which differ in thickness, design, and intended use:

- Restaurant Ware (c. 1948–c. 1967): The thickest and heaviest Jade-ite, designed for institutional use in diners, hospitals, hotels, and cafeterias. Pieces are undecorated and feature a clean, timeless profile. Earlier Restaurant Ware pieces were made at greater thickness; later pieces are somewhat thinner and feature a subtly beaded plate rim. Restaurant Ware is the most commonly found Jade-ite pattern and is a natural entry point for new collectors.
- Jane Ray (c. 1945–1963): A thinner, lighter alternative to Restaurant Ware, characterized by a rayed border design radiating outward from the plate rim. Jane Ray is the most frequently encountered Jade-ite pattern outside of Restaurant Ware and is likewise accessible to beginning collectors.
- Alice (1945–1949): The first Jade-ite dinnerware pattern, featuring an embossed floral-and-concentric-circle border. Distributed as a premium in oatmeal boxes. Also produced in a white (Vitrock) version.
- Charm (c. 1950–1956): The only square-format Jade-ite pattern, with a clean modernist silhouette. Charm was also produced in Turquoise Blue, Azur-ite, and White. The relatively short production window makes Charm pieces more difficult to find and more expensive than Jane Ray or Restaurant Ware.
- Lotus Leaf (c. 1950s): Produced in Jade-ite with a leaf-pattern border; a complete service including plates and bowls.
- Sheaves of Wheat (1957–1959): Embossed with a wheat-stalk design around the borders of plates and the exterior of bowls and cups. With only a two-year production run, Sheaves of Wheat is among the rarest and most sought-after Jade-ite patterns.
- Shell (1965–1976): Distinguished by a scalloped swirl edge; similar to the Swirl pattern but with a textured shell-like rim. Produced in Jade-ite through the final years of the brand.
- 1700 Line and Breakfast Set: Plain Jade-ite service pieces including the St. Denis cup and saucer; some pieces overlap with the Breakfast Set grouping.
- 4000 Line: A plain commercial line; includes some overlap with Restaurant Ware profiles.

Among individual Jade-ite pieces, the ball jug (a spherical pitcher with a flared mouth) is widely regarded as the most coveted single item in the category, with prices regularly exceeding several hundred dollars and sometimes approaching four figures. The Jade-ite range set (grease jar and salt-and-pepper shakers), refrigerator dishes, and Alice-pattern complete sets are also among the higher-value items.

The Jade-ite ball jug is sought in part because of its relative scarcity—it was produced for a limited time and in limited quantities—and in part because of its sculptural presence on a shelf. Complete services in any Jade-ite pattern are difficult to assemble because pieces were sold individually or in small sets over many years, and losses from breakage over seven or eight decades of use have been substantial.

=== Sapphire Blue ===
The first Fire-King color, Sapphire Blue (1942–c. 1945) is a transparent pale azure glass decorated with a pressed scrollwork design of medallions and ribbons. Because it predates the brand's most recognized era and was produced for only a few years, Sapphire Blue is among the rarest Fire-King categories. The Philbe pattern—a pressed raised design named, according to collector tradition, after its designer "Phil B." and formally identified by Depression-glass researcher Hazel Marie Weatherman—was originally produced as early as 1937–1938, predating the Fire-King name; the pattern was carried into the Fire-King line beginning in 1942 and appeared in Sapphire Blue, clear glass, Jade-ite, and Ivory. The Philbe pie plate and covered casserole in Sapphire Blue are among the more valuable individual Fire-King pieces.

=== Peach Lustre ===
Peach Lustre (1952–c. 1963) is an iridescent amber-pink glass achieved by applying a fired-on metallic oxide overglaze to clear or light glass. The effect, when viewed in natural light, produces a warm, mirror-like sheen that distinguishes Peach Lustre immediately from the brand's opaque solid-color lines. The Laurel Leaf pattern (also called Sheaves of Wheat in this colorway, confusingly) was Peach Lustre's most prominent design and was produced in complete dinner services. Peach Lustre was also produced in Swirl, Shell, Three Bands, and Kimberly Diamond patterns.

Because the fired-on overglaze is susceptible to scratching from normal use and to etching from dishwasher detergent, well-preserved Peach Lustre sets with full gloss intact are now comparatively scarce and correspondingly valued.

=== Turquoise Blue ===
Turquoise Blue (c. 1956–1962) is an opaque glass with a vivid blue-green teal tone, distinctly more saturated and more blue-leaning than Jade-ite. It was produced primarily in the Swirl pattern and the square-format Charm pattern. The Charm pattern in Turquoise Blue—with its unusual square plates and bowls—has attracted a dedicated collector following and commands a premium over equivalent Jade-ite Charm pieces.

=== Azur-ite ===
Azur-ite (also spelled "Azure-ite") is a lighter, paler blue than Turquoise Blue, with a softer, more pastel tone. Produced primarily in the 1960s, Azur-ite appeared in the Charm pattern and a small number of other forms. It is less common than Turquoise Blue and is sometimes overlooked by collectors unfamiliar with the color category.

=== Rose-ite and Burgundy ===
Rose-ite is a creamy opaque pink, described in period marketing as a soft feminine counterpart to Jade-ite. It should not be confused with "pink swirl," which is a fired-on pink color applied over white opaque glass. Burgundy is a deep wine-red opaque glass; both colors were produced in limited quantities and are among the less frequently encountered solid-color Fire-King lines. A pair of Burgundy coffee mugs sold at auction in the early 2020s for approximately $2,000, reflecting the extreme scarcity of pieces in this color.

=== White milk glass with decaled patterns ===
Anchor Hocking produced an extensive range of white opaque milk glass pieces decorated with fired-on decal patterns. These decals—applied to the surface before a final firing to bond them permanently—ranged from bold geometric designs to delicate floral motifs. Major decaled patterns included:

- Primrose: Clusters of small red and pink flowers against a white background; one of the most sophisticated and feminine designs in the line.
- Wheat (also Golden Wheat): Graceful wheat stalks with a warm gold-and-silver finish; produced in complete dinner services and highly regarded by collectors.
- Fleurette: A circle of small flowers, similar to Primrose in aesthetic sensibility; marketed particularly toward women and used in tea sets.
- Forget Me Not: Small blue flowers with yellow stalks; one of the more vivid and immediately recognizable decaled patterns.
- Anniversary Rose: A single rose motif with leaves; a popular gift pattern sold for wedding anniversaries.
- Blue Mosaic: An abstract pattern of blue squares suggesting stained glass; a bolder, more modernist design than the floral patterns.
- Meadow Green: A forest-green leafy motif with an oscillating, organic quality.
- Colonial Stripes, Harlequin, and polka-dot patterns: Geometric treatments popular in the mid-1950s through mid-1960s.

In the late 1950s, the Sealtest dairy company commissioned Fire-King to produce milk-glass cottage cheese bowls decorated with tulip graphics, which were distributed as a premium inside Sealtest Cottage Cheese containers. These branded promotional pieces are a collectible subset distinct from Anchor Hocking's own pattern lines.

=== Rainbow ===
Rainbow is a line of fired-on colors applied over clear glass in both pastel and primary shades: pastel green, pastel blue, pastel peach, pastel yellow, primary orange, primary blue, primary yellow, and primary green. Although Rainbow is categorized separately from Fire-King in some collector references—it was not marketed under the Fire-King name—it is included in most Fire-King price guides and is considered part of the broader Anchor Hocking mid-century glassware family. Rainbow has been described as Anchor Hocking's response to Fiestaware—a brightly colored, mix-and-match table aesthetic appealing to the same mid-century market for colorful affordable dinnerware.

=== Promotional and advertising mugs ===
A significant and active collector subcategory consists of Fire-King mugs produced with fired-on advertising graphics for restaurants, corporate clients, and promotional campaigns. These mugs, typically in the standard stackable C-handle mug format, carried the logos and characters of fast-food chains, regional diners, consumer brands, and licensed cartoon properties. Mugs bearing characters from Peanuts (including Snoopy's alter ego the Red Baron), early fast-food franchises, and regional restaurant chains regularly appear at auction. A Red Baron Fire-King mug with an orange roof sold for $310 at auction, and a Jade-ite Swirl Ball Pitcher has been offered with a reserve above $1,250. There is also significant collector interest in Japan, where vintage American Fire-King mugs have maintained a devoted following since at least the 1990s.

== Collecting ==
=== Authentication and identification ===
Counterfeit and misidentified Fire-King pieces are a known problem in the collector market. Anchor Hocking's embossed backstamp is the primary authentication tool for most pieces, but the variation in mark styles across the production run requires familiarity with the dating guide above. Unmarked Jade-ite pieces are identified by color consistency, glass weight and thickness, and pattern comparison against documented examples.

Key points of confusion include:

- The Hazel Atlas "H over A" mark is sometimes mistaken for an Anchor Hocking mark.
- Turquoise or teal glass pieces made by McKee, Federal Glass, and Hazel Atlas in the 1950s may superficially resemble Fire-King Turquoise Blue but carry different marks and have different glass profiles.
- Modern reproduction Jade-ite—from Chinese or Brazilian manufacturers—has entered the market and may lack the weight, color depth, and mark consistency of authentic pieces.

=== Collector resources ===
Several reference books are the standard collector resources for Fire-King identification and valuation:

- Clements, Monica Lynn; Clements, Patricia Rosser (1999). An Unauthorized Guide to Fire-King Glasswares. Atglen, PA: Schiffer Publishing. ISBN 0-7643-0839-4.
- Florence, Gene (2000). Anchor Hocking's Fire-King & More: Identification & Value Guide. Paducah, KY: Collector Books. ISBN 1-57432-164-1.
- Hopper, Philip (2002). Anchor Hocking Decorated Pitchers and Glasses: The Fire-King Years. Atglen, PA: Schiffer Publishing. ISBN 0-7643-1488-2.
- Keller, Joe; Ross, David (2002). Fire-King: An Information and Price Guide. Atglen, PA: Schiffer Publishing. ISBN 0-7643-1641-9.
- Keller, Joe; Ross, David (2014). Jadite: An Identification and Price Guide.
- Kilgo, Garry (1991). A Collector's Guide to Anchor Hocking's "Fire-King" Glassware. Addison, AL: K & W Collectibles.
- Tvorak, April M.; Terry, Matthew R. (1992). History and Price Guide to Fire-King. Canon City, CO: VAL Enterprises.

=== Valuation ===
Values for Fire-King glassware vary widely by color, pattern, completeness, and condition. Common Restaurant Ware Jade-ite pieces—coffee mugs, plates, and bowls—typically sell in the range of $15 to $50 individually. Jade-ite mixing bowls command $40 to $80 depending on size and condition. Rare forms such as the Jade-ite ball jug, range sets, and Alice-pattern complete services can reach $200 to $400 or more. The most exceptional pieces—rare colors like Burgundy, or unusual forms in excellent condition—have sold at auction for thousands of dollars. Complete dinner services in any Jade-ite pattern are uncommon and correspondingly expensive.

Peach Lustre values generally run somewhat below equivalent Jade-ite pieces, reflecting the smaller collector base, though well-preserved sets with full iridescent gloss command substantial premiums. Turquoise Blue Charm pieces are among the more actively priced of the non-Jade-ite categories.

== In popular culture ==
The ubiquity of Jade-ite Restaurant Ware in mid-century American institutional settings has made it a reliable period-signifier in film and television productions set in that era. Jade-ite dishes are visible in the staff room in the second episode of the Netflix series Ratched (2020), a prequel to One Flew Over the Cuckoo's Nest set in a 1940s California psychiatric hospital.

== See also ==
- Anchor Hocking
- Depression glass
- Jadeite (kitchenware)
- Pyrex
