= Mosser Glass =

Glassware manufacturer in Cambridge, Ohio

Mosser Glass is a company making handmade glass, founded in Cambridge, Ohio, in 1970 by Thomas R. Mosser. The company is operated by his oldest son, Tim Mosser. The Mosser family got their start in the business at the Cambridge Glass Company.

The company offers tours of its facilities.
