= Anchor Hocking =

Manufacturer of glassware

- Formerly: The Hocking Glass Company; Anchor Hocking Glass Corporation
- Company type: Subsidiary
- Industry: Glassware and other consumer products
- Founded: 1905
- Founders: Isaac J. Collins and E. B. Good
- Headquarters: Lancaster, Ohio, United States
- Brands: Fire King, Laurel, Corelle, Oneida
- Parent: Anchor Hocking Holdings, Inc.
- Website: anchorhocking.com

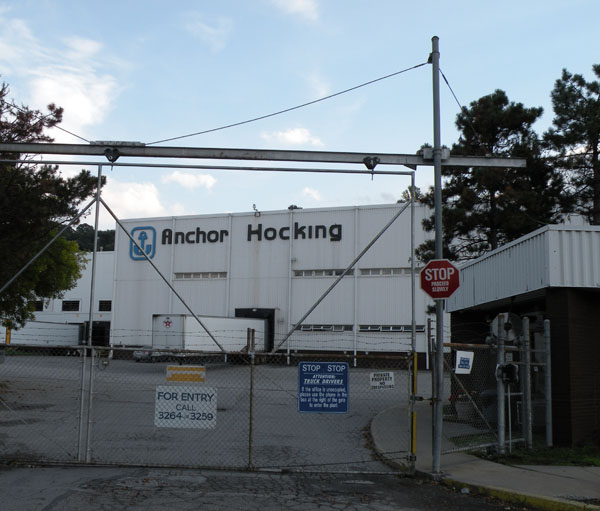
Plant #44 in Monaca, Pennsylvania.

Anchor Hocking is an American manufacturer of glassware and other consumer products based in Lancaster, Ohio.

== History ==
The Hocking Glass Company was founded in 1905 by Isaac J. Collins in Lancaster, Ohio, and named after the Hocking River. That company merged with the Anchor Cap and Closure Corporation in 1937 to form Anchor Hocking.

In 1934, Hocking Glass and a subsidiary, General Glass, developed the first nonreturnable beer bottle, considered a significant development in the field.

In 1987, the Newell Company acquired Anchor Hocking Corporation in a hostile takeover. Longtime company executives were fired and the headquarters were shut down, leading to a disconnect between corporate management and community members in Lancaster, Ohio.

=== Private equity ===
In 2004, Newell Rubbermaid sold Anchor Hocking to New York City-based Global Home Products, LLC, an affiliate of Cerberus Capital Management LP.

When Global Home Products declared bankruptcy in 2006, Anchor Hocking was sold to Monomoy Capital Partners, who merged Anchor Hocking with Oneida in 2012 and created EveryWare Global. In January 2014, EveryWare Global announced its plans to close its regional office and the Oneida outlet store, both in Sherrill, New York, with the process starting in April. The original Oneida outlet store in Sherrill, New York, was closed April 26, 2014. EveryWare Global filed for bankruptcy in 2015. EveryWare Global was renamed The Oneida Group in 2017.

In June 2021, Oneida Consumer LLC, including the Oneida brand, was acquired by Lenox Corporation, bringing Anchor Hocking under the control of private equity firm Centre Lane Partners. In July 2021 Centre Lane renamed The Oneida Group as Anchor Hocking Holdings, Inc.

Centre Lane Partners gained control of Corelle Brands, manufacturer of Pyrex, in a controversial 2024 acquisition. While the initial purchase received minimal attention, the deal became more widely known after it was announced that Anchor Hocking would be closing down the 132-year-old Pyrex factory in Charleroi, Pennsylvania, and relocating all production to Lancaster, Ohio. Despite pushback from Senators Bob Casey Jr. and John Fetterman and legal action by the State of Pennsylvania, the motions were dismissed and Anchor Hocking closed the Charleroi factory in April 2025.

== Locations ==
Anchor Hocking's factory in Lancaster, Ohio, was first built in 1905 and has remained the company's main production site throughout its existence. There were tensions between organized labor at the factory and corporate leadership through much of the early 20th century, driven by lower-than-average pay and dangerous working conditions for employees. After the passage of the National Industrial Recovery Act in 1933, local union leaders gained more leverage and were able to negotiate for improvements such as higher pay and safer conditions. In 1947, Forbes Magazine dedicated its 30th Anniversary issue to Lancaster and its relationship with Anchor Hocking. After Newell's takeover of Anchor Hocking in 1987 company executives stopped living in Lancaster, contributing to a sense that corporate leadership was no longer interested in helping their community.

From 1937 to 1983, the company operated the oldest glass-manufacturing facility in the United States, established in 1863, in Salem, New Jersey. Anchor Hocking's wine and spirit bottles were crafted at a factory in Monaca, Pennsylvania.

Many Anchor Hocking glass container plants were spun off in 1983 as part of the Anchor Glass Container Corporation, with headquarters in Tampa, Florida. As of 2025, Anchor Glass Container has manufacturing facilities in Warner Robins, Georgia; Lawrenceburg, Indiana; Henryetta, Oklahoma; Shakopee, Minnesota; and Elmira, New York.

In March 2021, Anchor Hocking's Monaca, Pennsylvania factory was sold to Austrian manufacturer Stölzle Glass.

== Products ==
=== Depression glass ===
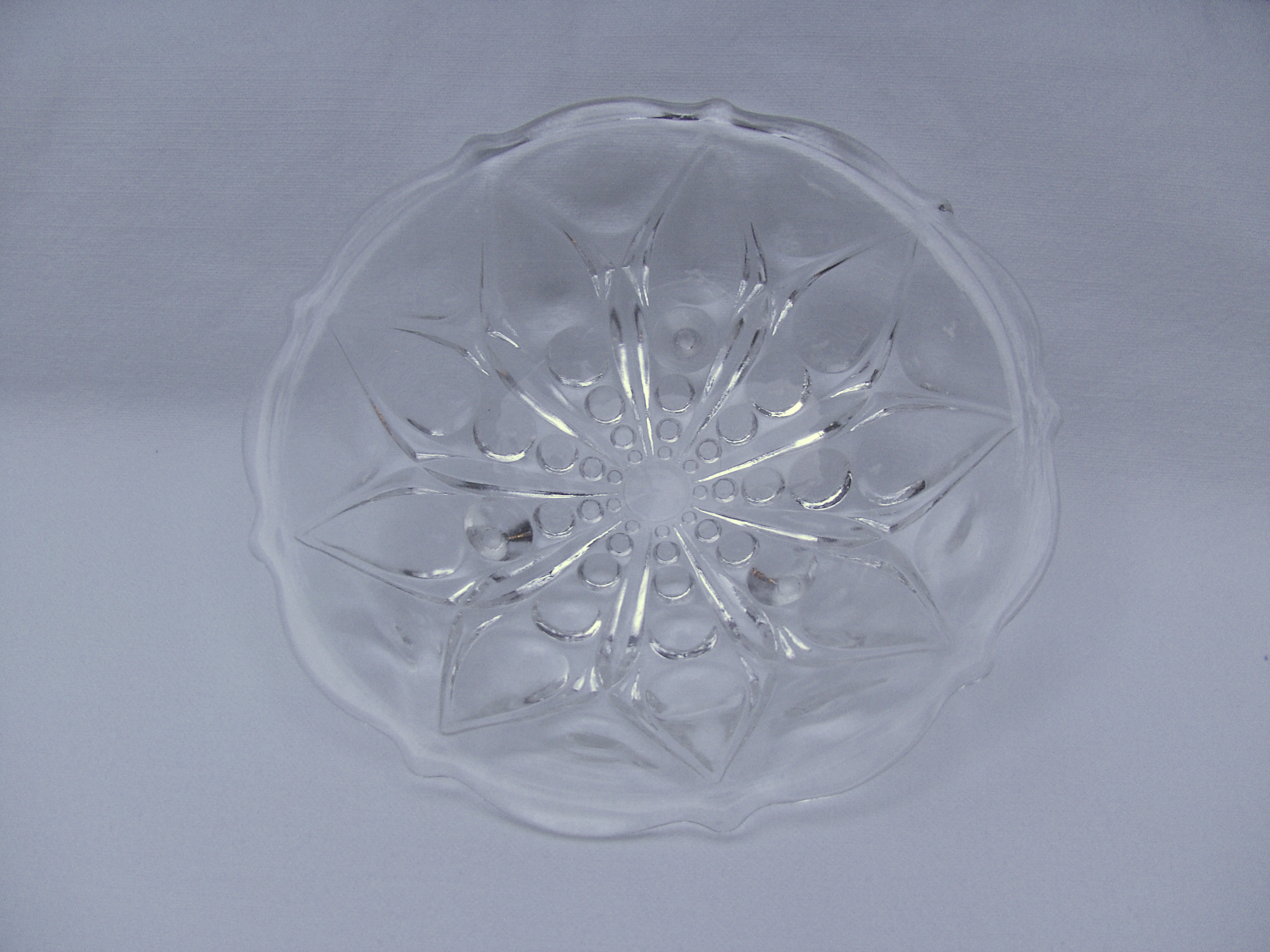
Anchor Hocking Depression glass, Teardrop and Dot pattern

The company was a major producer of Depression glass. The first glassware produced as Anchor Hocking Glass Company was Royal Ruby in 1939. In addition, Anchor Hocking produced Forest Green Glass and Fire-King and Anchor Ovenware.

== In popular culture ==
The company was the sponsor of the radio drama Casey, Crime Photographer. It played a major role in originating late-night television when it sponsored NBC's Broadway Open House in 1950.

Anchor Hocking's takeover by private equity and its effect on the city of Lancaster, Ohio, are a focus of Brian Alexander's 2017 book Glass House.

== See also ==
- Newell Company
