= History of glass =

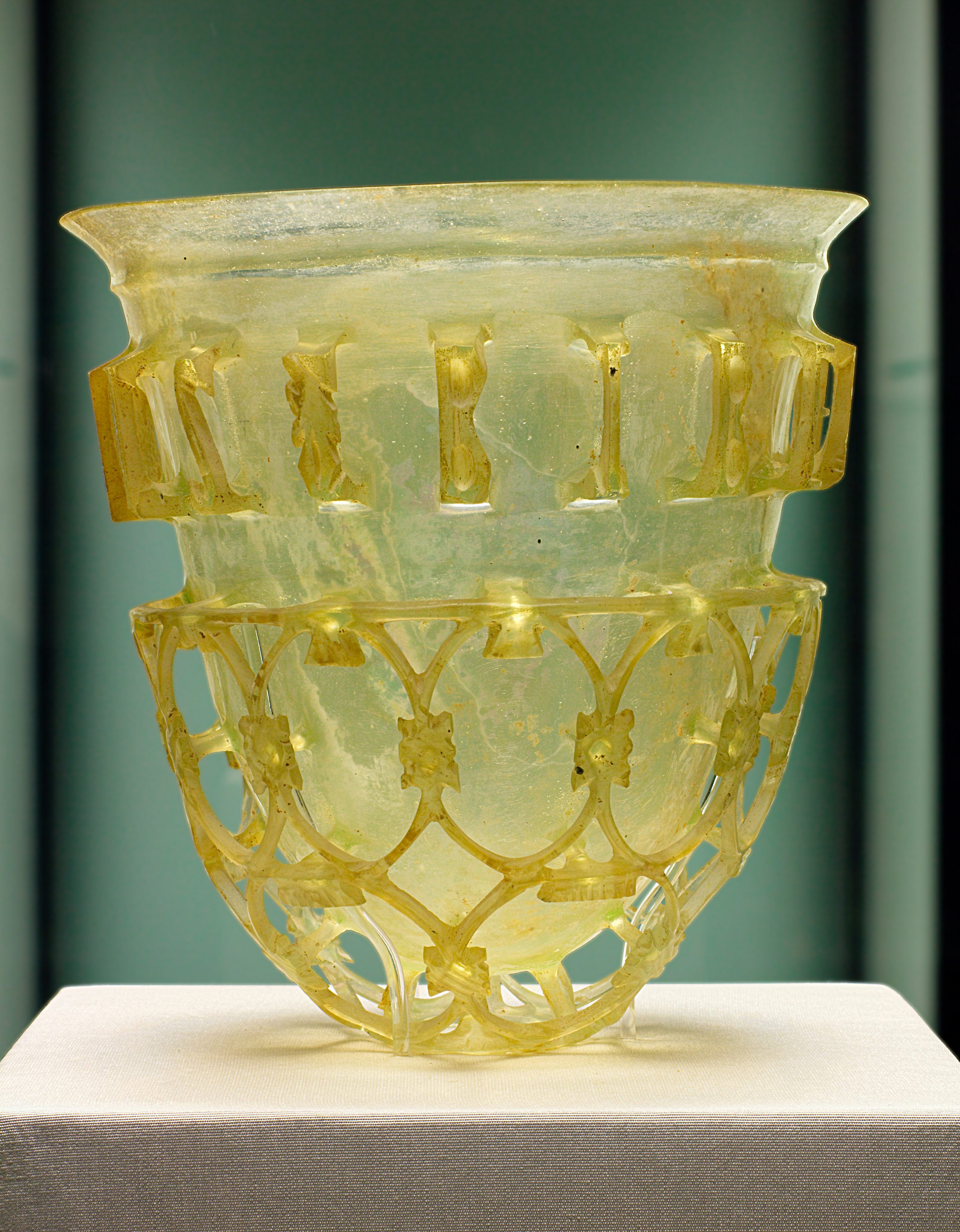
Roman cage cup from the 4th century CE

The history of glass-making dates back to around the mid-third millennium BCE. Archaeological evidence suggests that the first true glass was made in Syria, Mesopotamia or ancient Egypt. The earliest known glass objects, of the mid 2,000 BCE, were beads, perhaps initially created as the accidental by-products of metal-working (slags) or during the production of faience, a pre-glass vitreous material made by a process similar to glazing. (Note: True glazing over a ceramic body was not used until many centuries after the production of the first glass.) Glass products remained a luxury until the disasters that overtook the late Bronze Age civilizations seemingly brought glass-making to a halt.

Development of glass technology in India may have begun in 1,730 BCE.

From across the former Roman Empire, archaeologists have recovered glass objects that were used in domestic, industrial and funerary contexts. Anglo-Saxon glass has been found across England during archaeological excavations of both settlement and cemetery sites. Glass in the Anglo-Saxon period was used in the manufacture of a range of objects, including vessels, beads, windows, and was even used in jewellery.

== Origins ==
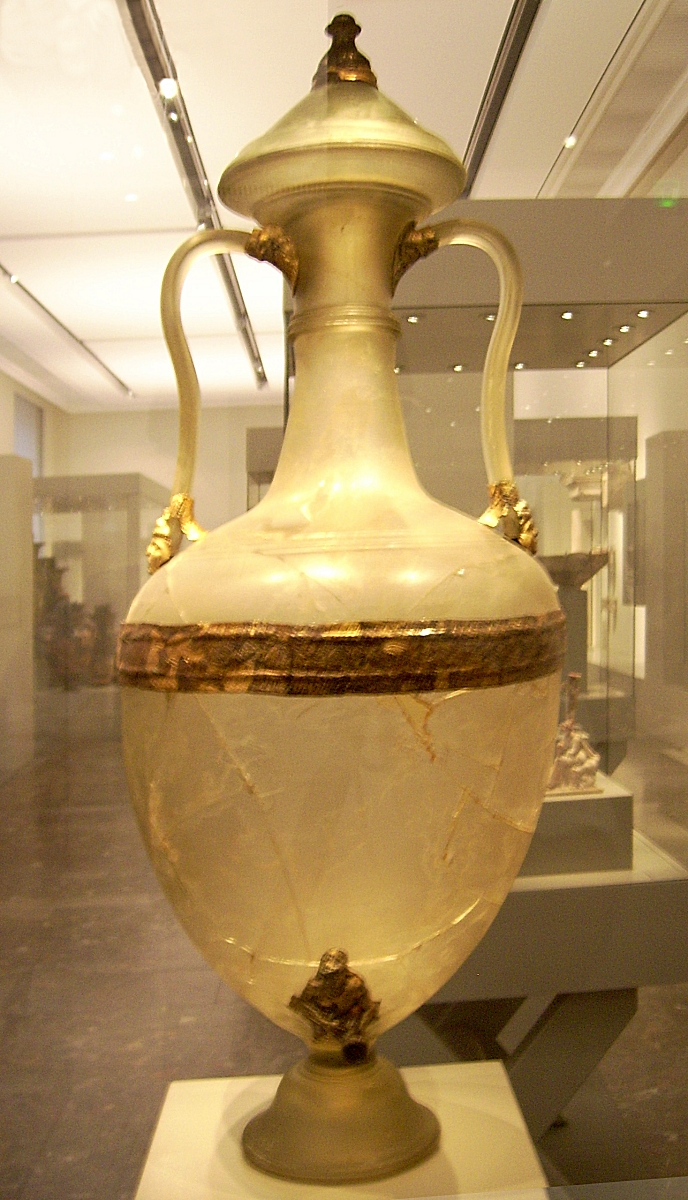
Ancient Greek glass amphora from the Hellenistic period.

Naturally occurring glass, especially the volcanic glass obsidian, has been used by many Stone Age societies across the globe for the production of sharp cutting tools and, due to its limited source areas, was extensively traded. But in general, archaeological evidence suggests that the first true glass was made in coastal north Syria, Mesopotamia or ancient Egypt.

A lump of glass was found at Eridu in Iraq that can be dated to the twenty-first century BCE or even earlier; it was produced during the Akkadian Empire or the early Ur III period. The glass is of blue colour, which was achieved with cobalt. Such glass is generally known as Egyptian blue, but the technique was attested in Eridu long before it emerged in Egypt.

Because of Egypt's favorable environment for preservation, the majority of well-studied early glass is found there, although some of this is likely to have been imported. The earliest known glass objects, of the mid-third millennium BCE, were beads, perhaps initially created as accidental by-products of metal-working (slags) or during the production of faience, a pre-glass vitreous material made by a process similar to glazing.

During the Late Bronze Age in Egypt (e.g., the Ahhotep "Treasure") and Western Asia (e.g., Megiddo), there was a rapid growth in glassmaking technology. Archaeological finds from this period include colored glass ingots, vessels (often colored and shaped in imitation of highly prized hardstone carvings in semi-precious stones) and the ubiquitous beads. The alkali of Syrian and Egyptian glass was soda ash (sodium carbonate), which can be extracted from the ashes of many plants, notably halophile seashore plants like saltwort. The latest vessels were 'core-formed', produced by winding a ductile rope of glass around a shaped core of sand and clay over a metal rod, then fusing it by reheating it several times.

Threads of thin glass of different colors made with admixtures of oxides were subsequently wound around these to create patterns, which could be drawn into festoons by using metal raking tools. The vessel would then be rolled smooth (marvered) on a slab in order to press the decorative threads into its body. Handles and feet were applied separately. The rod was subsequently allowed to cool as the glass slowly annealed and was eventually removed from the center of the vessel, after which the core material was scraped out. Glass shapes for inlays were also often created in moulds. Much of early glass production, however, relied on grinding techniques borrowed from stone working. This meant that the glass was ground and carved in a cold state.

By the 15th century BCE, extensive glass production was occurring in Western Asia, Crete, and Egypt; and the Mycenaean Greek term 𐀓𐀷𐀜𐀺𐀒𐀂, ku-wa-no-wo-ko-i, meaning "workers of lapis lazuli and glass" (written in Linear b syllabic script) is attested. (Note: Found on the MY Oi 701, MY Oi 702, MY Oi 703 and MY Oi 704 tablets; the least damaged, as far as this word is concerned, is MY Oi 703.) (Note: Cf. κύανος.) It is thought that the techniques and recipes required for the initial fusing of glass from raw materials were a closely guarded technological secret reserved for the large palace industries of powerful states. Glass workers in other areas therefore relied on imports of preformed glass, often in the form of cast ingots such as those found on the Ulu Burun shipwreck off the coast of modern Turkey.

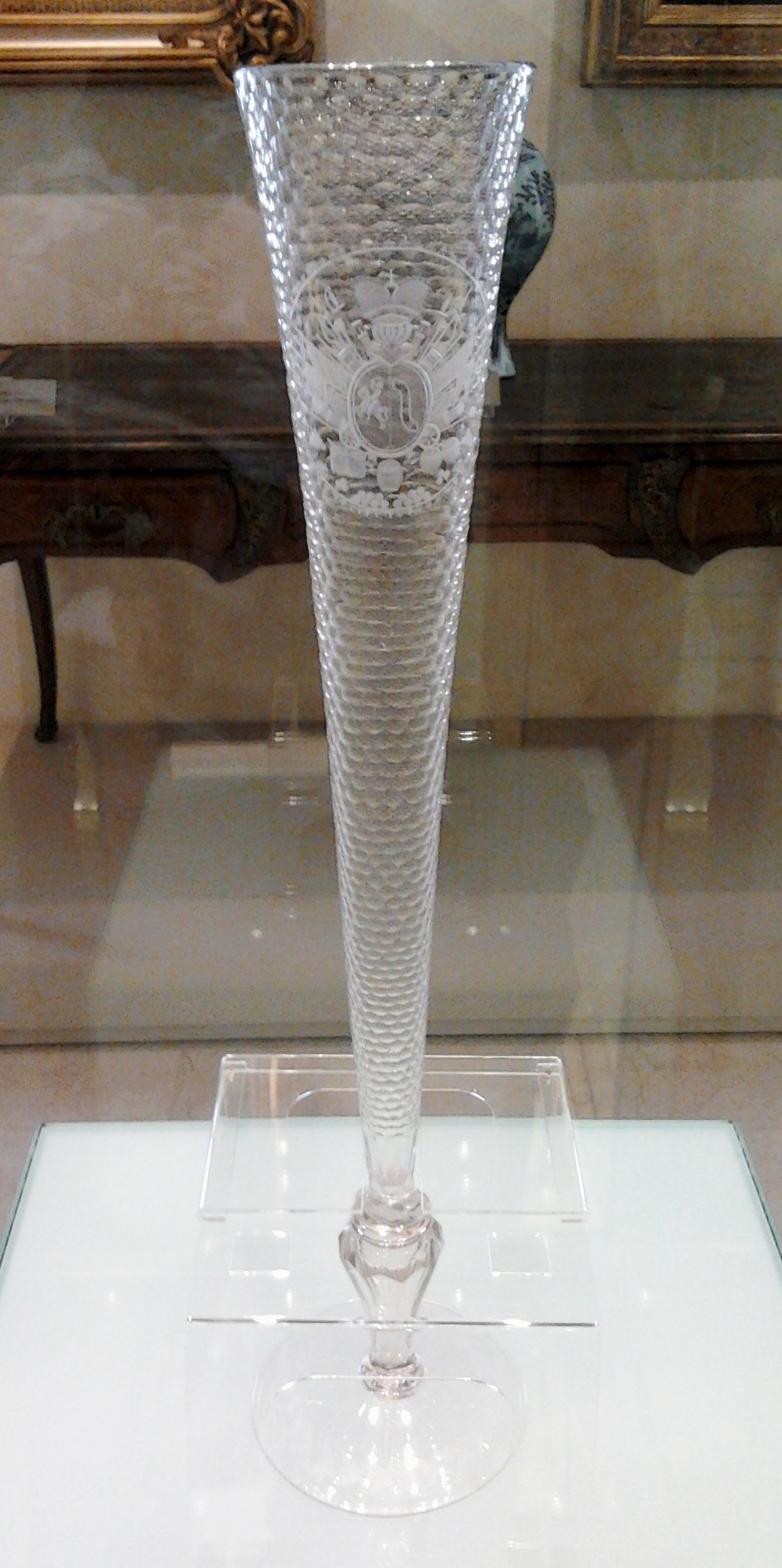
An early 18th-century goblet with coats of arms in the District Museum in Tarnów is one of the highest (54.3 cm, 21.4 in) preserved examples of artistry of less known Lubaczów glass manufacturing factory. The goblet was almost entirely covered with a pattern of so-called carp scales and hand-engraved decoration.

Glass remained a luxury material, and the disasters that overtook Late Bronze Age civilizations seemed to have brought glass-making to a halt. It picked up again in its former sites, Syria and Cyprus, in the 9th century BCE, when the techniques for making colorless glass were discovered.

The first glassmaking "manual" dates back to ca. 650 BCE. Instructions on how to make glass are contained in cuneiform tablets discovered in the library of the Assyrian king Ashurbanipal.

In Egypt, glass-making did not revive until it was reintroduced in Ptolemaic Alexandria. Core-formed vessels and beads were still widely produced, but other techniques came to the fore with experimentation and technological advancements.

During the Hellenistic period many new techniques of glass production were introduced and glass began to be used to make larger pieces, notably table wares. Techniques developed during this period include 'slumping' viscous (but not fully molten) glass over a mould in order to form a dish and 'millefiori' (meaning 'thousand flowers') technique, where canes of multicolored glass were sliced and the slices arranged together and fused in a mould to create a mosaic-like effect. It was also during this period that colorless or decolored glass began to be prized and methods for achieving this effect were investigated more fully.

According to Pliny the Elder, Phoenician traders were the first to stumble upon glass manufacturing techniques at the site of the Belus River. Georgius Agricola, in De re metallica, reported a traditional serendipitous "discovery" tale of familiar type:

The tradition is that a merchant ship laden with nitrum being moored at this place, the merchants were preparing their meal on the beach, and not having stones to prop up their pots, they used lumps of nitrum from the ship, which fused and mixed with the sands of the shore, and there flowed streams of a new translucent liquid, and thus was the origin of glass.

This account is more a reflection of Roman experience of glass production, however, as white silica sand from this area was used in the production of glass within the Roman Empire due to its high purity levels. During the 1st century BCE, glass blowing was discovered on the Syro-Palestinian coast, revolutionizing the industry. The earliest known evidence of glassblowing was found in Jerusalem, in a layer of fill inside a ritual bath that was overlain with the paving stones of the Herodian street. Around this time, large glassblowing workshops were established by Phoenicians across the Eastern Mediterranean. By the 1st century, workshops like Ennion's began producing decorated mold-blown glassware. Glass vessels were now inexpensive compared to pottery vessels. Growth of the use of glass products occurred throughout the Roman world. Glass became the Roman plastic, and glass containers produced in Alexandria spread throughout the Roman Empire. With the discovery of clear glass (through the introduction of manganese dioxide), by glass blowers in Alexandria circa 100 CE, the Romans began to use glass for architectural purposes. Cast glass windows, albeit with poor optical qualities, began to appear in the most important buildings in Rome and the most luxurious villas of Herculaneum and Pompeii. Over the next 1,000 years, glass making and working continued and spread through southern Europe and beyond.

== History by culture ==
=== Iran ===
The first Persian glass comes in the form of beads dating to the late Bronze Age (1600 BCE), and was discovered during the explorations of Dinkhah Tepe in Iranian by Charles Burney. Glass tubes were discovered by French archaeologists at Chogha Zanbil, belonging to the middle Elamite period. Mosaic glass cups have also been found at Teppe Hasanlu and Marlik Tepe in northern Iran, dating to the Iron Age. These cups resemble ones from Mesopotamia, as do cups found in Susa during the late Elamite period.

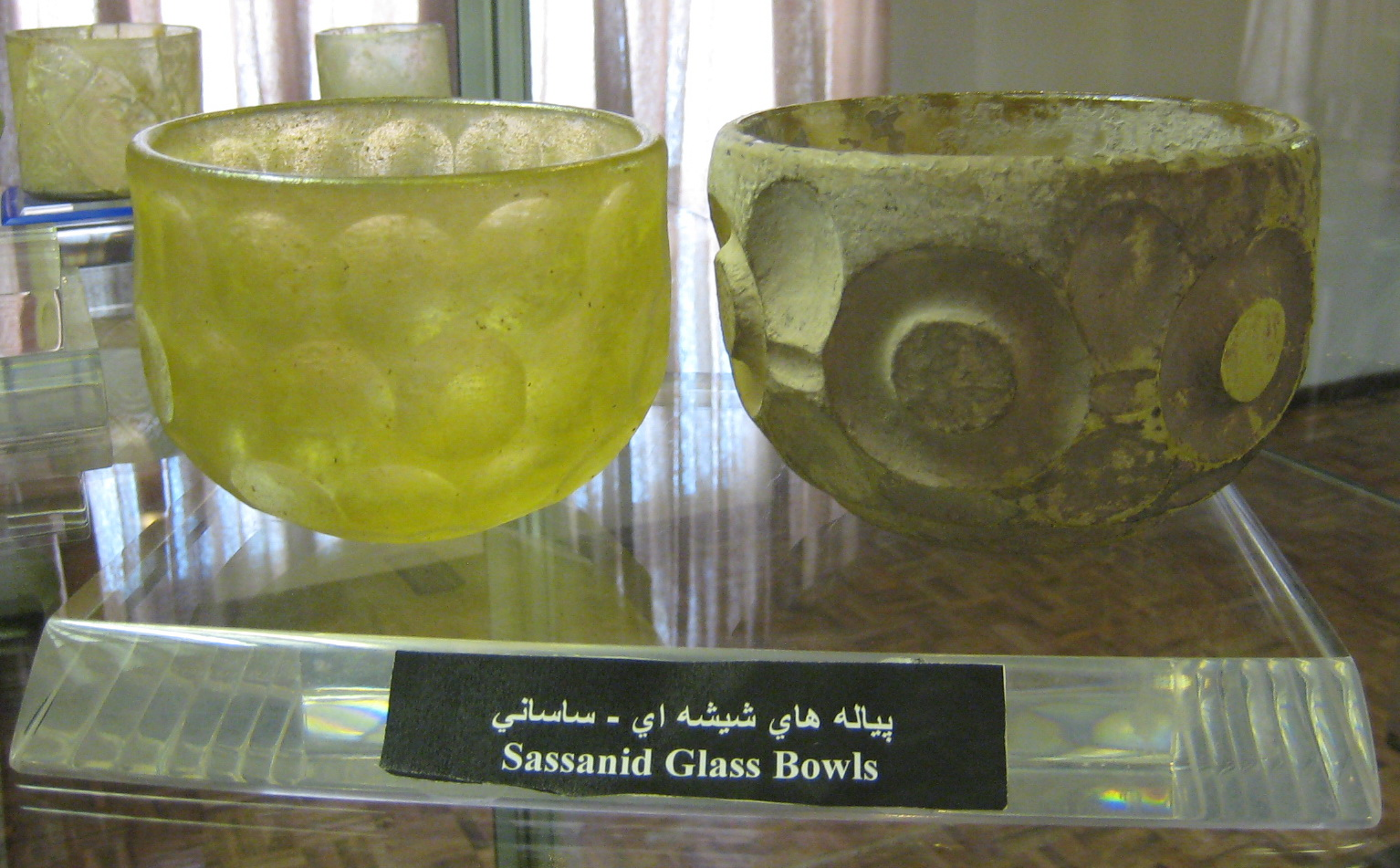
Sassanid glass bowls

Glass tubes containing kohl have also been found in Iranian, belonging to the Achaemenid period. During this time, glass vessels were usually plain and colorless. By the Seleucid and late Parthian era, Greek and Roman techniques were prevalent. During the Sasanian period, glass vessels were decorated with local motifs.

=== Levant and Anatolia ===
A glassmaking crucible was discovered at Alalakh in the Amuq Valley of Turkey during the excavation seasons 2011–2014. This is the earliest evidence for glassmaking in the Syro-Levantine zone – the area which became famous for glassmaking later on. This material is "contemporary with, or even slightly earlier" than the fourteenth-century BC dates from Egypt.

The discovery provides the earliest evidence for Late Bronze Age glassmaking outside of Egypt and the central Mesopotamia.

This production area may be associated with the Kingdom of Mitanni. According to the authors, this geographical area can be linked to the descriptions of glassmaking in cuneiform tablets, which provides some additional historical context.

A glass bottle fragment from Büklükale, in central Turkey, is estimated to be around 1600 BC old. This may represent the oldest glass work in Anatolia. The fragment is from the Hittite Empire period. It is unusually large compared to other glass bottles from Mesopotamia at the time. A production centre of glass may have existed in this area of Anatolia.

=== India ===
Evidence of glass during the Chalcolithic has been found in Hastinapur, India. The earliest glass item from the Indus Valley civilization is a brown glass bead found at Harappa, dating to 1700 BCE. This makes it the earliest evidence of glass in South Asia. Glass discovered from later sites dating from 600 to 300 BCE displays common colors.

Texts such as the Shatapatha Brahmana and Vinaya Pitaka mention glass, implying they could have been known in India during the early first millennium BCE. Glass objects have also been found at Beed, Sirkap and Sirsukh, all dating to around the 5th century BCE. However, the first unmistakable evidence for widespread glass usage comes from the ruins of Taxila (3rd century BCE), where bangles, beads, small vessels, and tiles were discovered in large quantities. These glassmaking techniques may have been transmitted from cultures in Western Asia.

The site of Kopia, in Uttar Pradesh, is the first site in India to locally manufacture glass, with items dating between the 7th century BCE to the 2nd century CE. Early Indian glass of this period was likely made locally, as they differ significantly in chemical composition when compared to Babylonian, Roman and Chinese glass.

By the 1st century AD, glass was being used for ornaments and casing in South Asia. Contact with the Greco-Roman world added newer techniques, and Indians artisans mastered several techniques of glass molding, decorating and coloring by the succeeding centuries. The Satavahana period of India also produced short cylinders of composite glass, including those displaying a lemon yellow matrix covered with green glass.

=== China ===
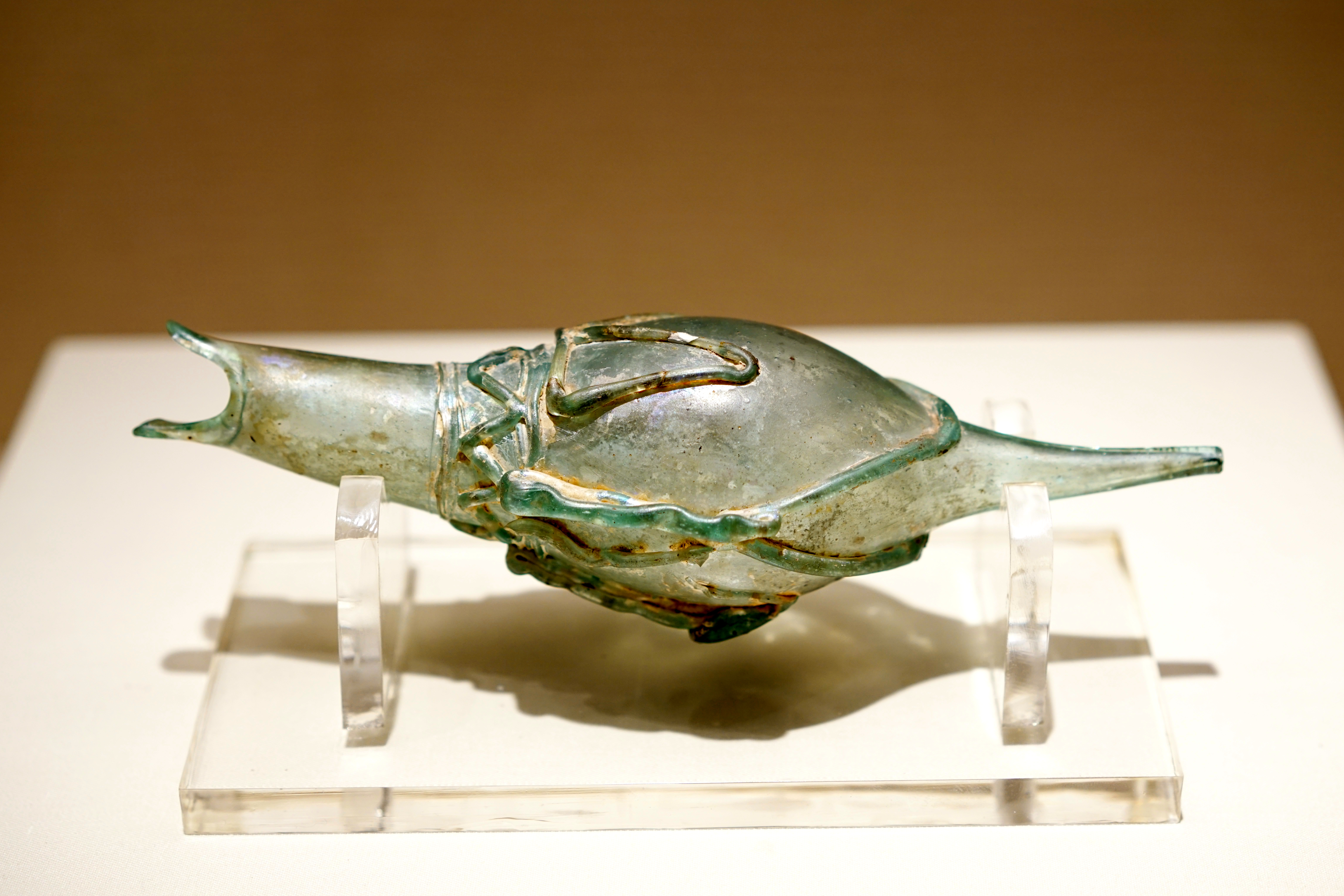
Xianbei glass water dropper

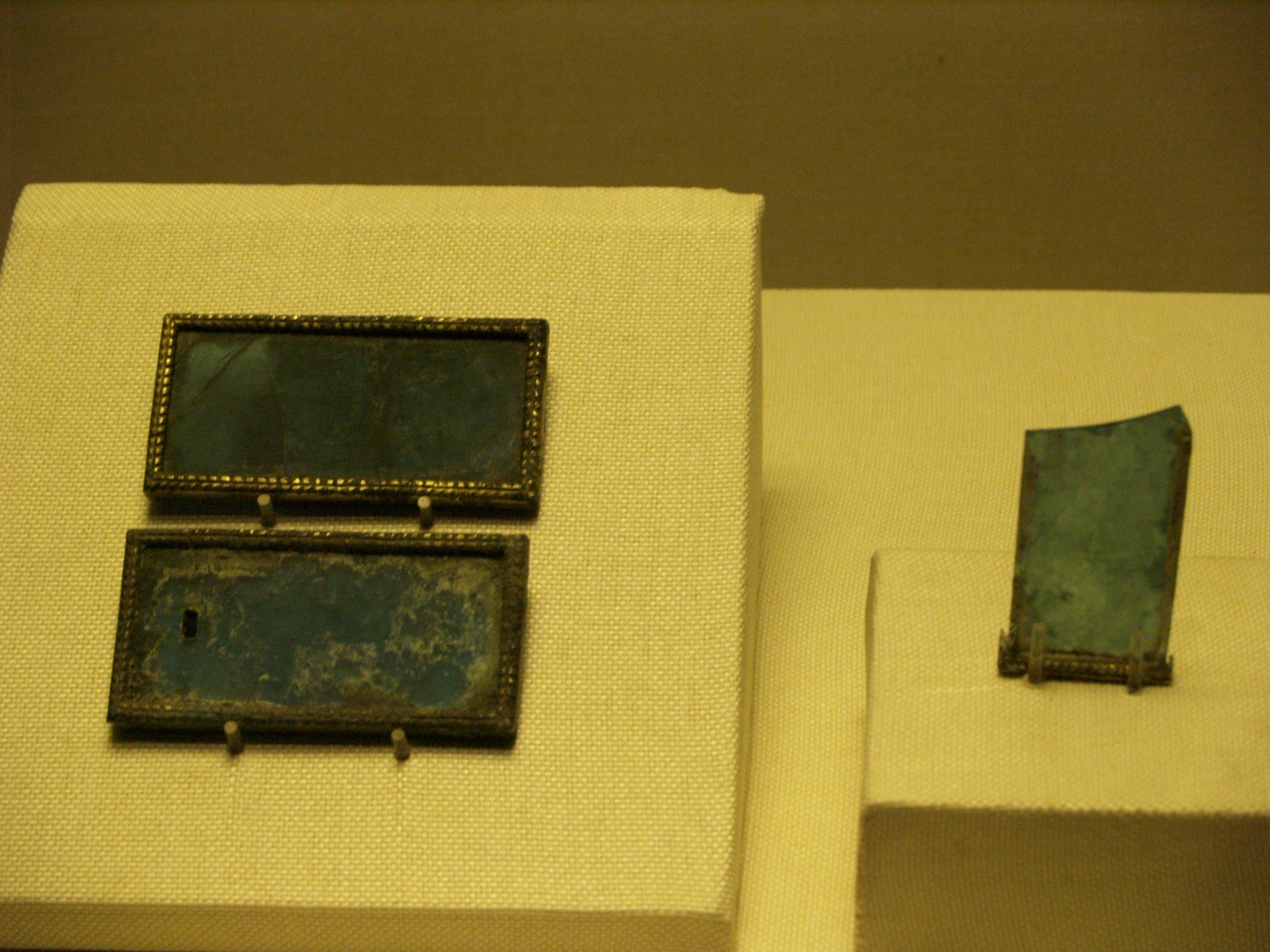
Blue glass plaques found in the Mausoleum of the Nanyue King, dating from late 2nd century BCE

In China, glass played a peripheral role in arts and crafts when compared to ceramics and metal work. The earliest glass items in China come from the Warring States period (475–221 BCE), although they are rare in number and limited in archaeological distribution.

Glassmaking developed later in China compared to cultures in Mesopotamia, Egypt and India. Imported glass objects first reached China during the late Spring and Autumn period (early 5th century BCE), in the form of polychrome eye beads. These imports created the impetus for the production of indigenous glass beads.

During the Han Dynasty (206 BCE–220 CE), the use of glass diversified. The introduction of glass casting in this period encouraged the production of moulded objects, such as bi disks and other ritual objects. Chinese glass objects from the Warring States and Han period vary greatly in chemical composition from the imported glass objects. The glasses from this period contain high levels of barium oxide and lead, distinguishing them from the soda–lime–silica glasses of Western Asia and Mesopotamia. At the end of the Han Dynasty (AD 220), the lead-barium glass tradition declined, with glass production only resuming during the 4th and 5th centuries AD. Literary sources also mention the manufacture of glass during the 5th century AD.

=== Roman World ===
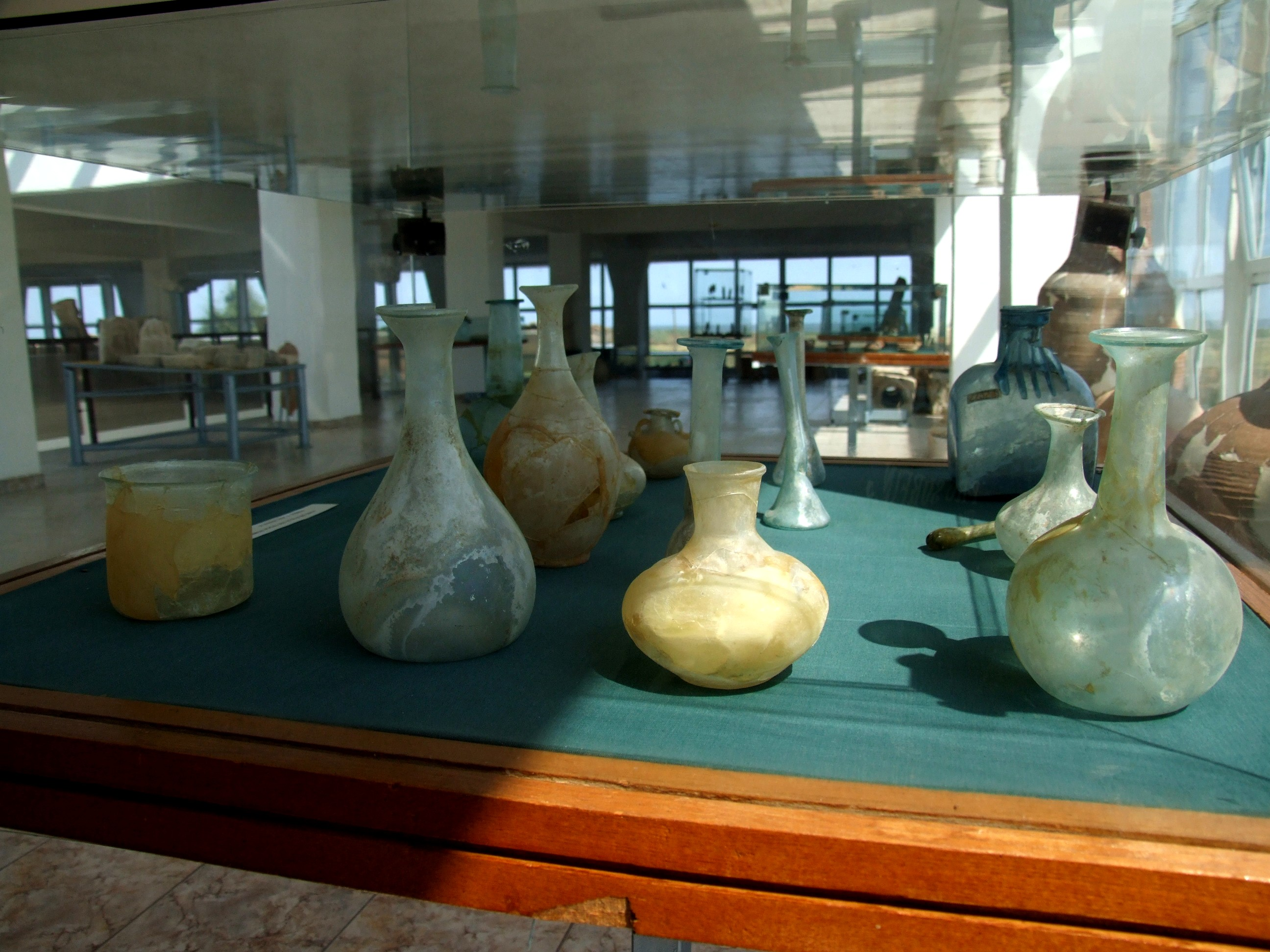
Roman glass

Roman glass production developed from Hellenistic technical traditions, initially concentrating on the production of intensely colored, cast glass vessels. Glass objects have been recovered across the Roman Empire in domestic, funerary and industrial contexts. Glass was used primarily for the production of vessels, although mosaic tiles and window glass were also produced.

However, during the 1st century CE, the industry underwent rapid technical growth that saw the introduction of glass-blowing and the dominance of colorless or ‘aqua’ glasses. Raw glass was produced in geographically separate locations to the working of glass into finished vessels, and, by the end of the 1st century CE, large scale manufacturing, primarily in Alexandria, resulted in the establishment of glass as a commonly available material in the Roman world.

=== Islamic world ===
Islamic glass continued the achievements of pre-Islamic cultures, especially the Sasanian glass of Persia. The Arab poet al-Buhturi (820–897) described the clarity of such glass: "Its color hides the glass as if it is standing in it without a container." In the 8th century, the Persian-Arab chemist Jābir ibn Hayyān (Geber) described 46 recipes for producing colored glass in Kitab al-Durra al-Maknuna (The Book of the Hidden Pearl), in addition to 12 recipes inserted by al-Marrakishi in a later edition of the book.

=== Africa ===
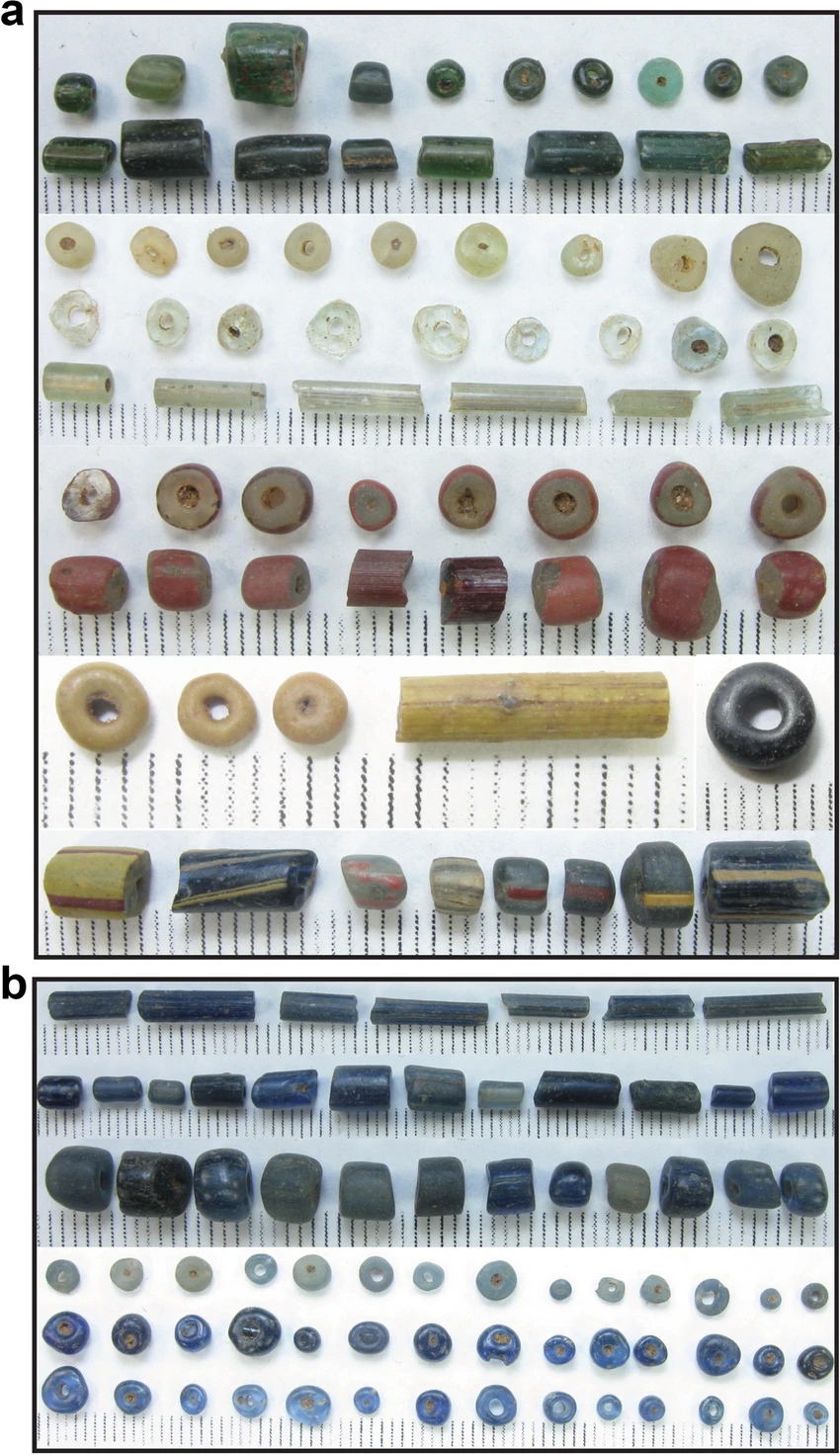
Glass from Ile-Ife, Yorubaland

Evidence suggests that indigenous glass production existed in West Africa well before extensive contact with other glassmaking regions. The most significant and well-documented example is the Ife Empire of Southwestern Nigeria. Archaeological excavations at Igbo Olokun, a site in northern Ife, have yielded a substantial quantity of glass beads, crucibles, and production debris dating from the 11th to 15th centuries CE. Chemical analysis revealed a unique chemical signature significantly different from known imported glass types.

The Igbo Olokun glass is characterized by a high-lime, high-alumina (HLHA) composition, reflecting the use of locally sourced raw materials, likely including granitic sands and possibly calcium carbonate from sources such as snail shells. At least two distinct glass types, HLHA and low-lime, high-alumina (LLHA), were produced at Igbo Olokun. Colorants including manganese, iron, cobalt, and copper were intentionally added to produce a range of colors, most notably various shades of dichroic blue and green. Analysis also revealed the presence of glass production waste, including fragments of crucibles bearing vitrified glass residues, confirming the onsite nature of the manufacturing.

=== Medieval Europe ===
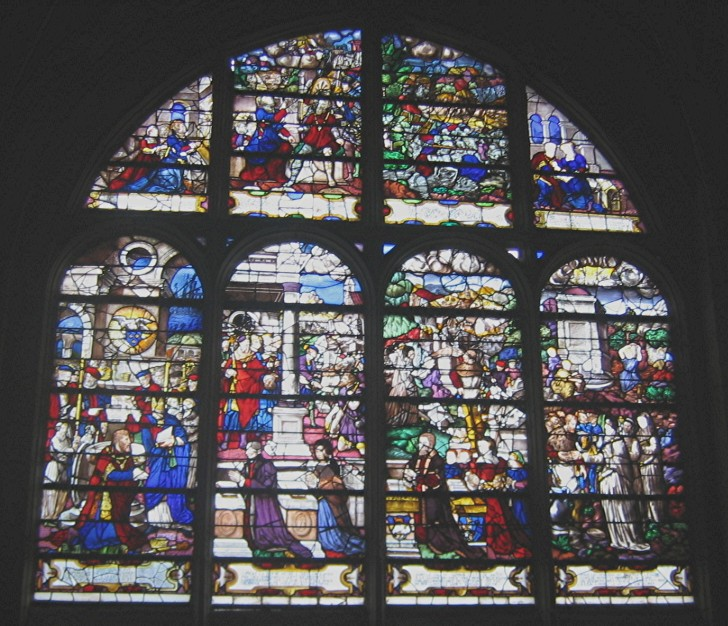
A 16th-century stained glass window

After the collapse of the Western Roman Empire, independent glass making technologies emerged in Northern Europe, with artisan forest glass produced by several cultures. Byzantine Glass evolved the Roman tradition, in the Eastern Empire. The claw beaker was popular as a relatively easy to make but an impressive vessel that exploited the unique potential of glass.

Glass objects from the 7th and 8th centuries have been found on the island of Torcello near Venice. These form an important link between Roman times and the later importance of that city in the production of the material. Around 1000 AD, an important technical breakthrough was made in Northern Europe when soda glass, produced from white pebbles and burnt vegetation was replaced by glass made from a much more readily available material: potash obtained from wood ashes. From this point on, northern glass differed significantly from that made in the Mediterranean area, where soda remained in common use.

Until the 12th century, stained glass – glass to which metallic or other impurities had been added for coloring – was not widely used, but it rapidly became an important medium for Romanesque art and especially Gothic art. Almost all survivals are in church buildings, but it was also used in grand secular buildings. The 11th century saw the emergence in Germany of new ways of making sheet glass by blowing spheres. The spheres were swung out to form cylinders and then cut while still hot, after which the sheets were flattened. This technique was perfected in 13th century Venice. The crown glass process was used up to the mid-19th century. In this process, the glassblower would spin approximately 9 pounds (4 kg) of molten glass at the end of a rod until it flattened into a disk approximately 5 feet (1.5 m) in diameter. The disk would then be cut into panes. Domestic glass vessels in late medieval Northern Europe are known as forest glass.

==== Anglo-Saxon world ====
Anglo-Saxon glass has been found across England during archaeological excavations of both settlement and cemetery sites. Glass in the Anglo-Saxon period was used in the manufacture of a range of objects including vessels, beads, windows and was even used in jewelry. In the 5th century AD with the Roman departure from Britain, there were also considerable changes in the usage of glass. Excavation of Romano-British sites has revealed plentiful amounts of glass but, in contrast, the amount recovered from the 5th century and later Anglo-Saxon sites is minuscule.

The majority of complete vessels and assemblages of beads come from the excavations of early Anglo-Saxon cemeteries, but a change in burial rites in the late 7th century affected the recovery of glass, as Christian Anglo-Saxons were buried with fewer grave goods, and glass is rarely found. From the late 7th century onwards, window glass is found more frequently. This is directly related to the introduction of Christianity and the construction of churches and monasteries. There are a few Anglo-Saxon ecclesiastical literary sources that mention the production and use of glass, although these relate to window glass used in ecclesiastical buildings. Glass was also used by the Anglo-Saxons in their jewelry, both as enamel or as cut glass insets.

==== Murano ====
The center for luxury Italian glassmaking from the 14th century was the island of Murano, which developed many new techniques and became the center of a lucrative export trade in dinnerware, mirrors, and other items. What made Venetian Murano glass significantly different was that the local quartz pebbles were almost pure silica, and were ground into a fine clear sand that was combined with soda ash obtained from the Levant, for which the Venetians held the sole monopoly. The clearest and finest glass is tinted in two ways: firstly, a natural coloring agent is ground and melted with the glass. Many of these coloring agents still exist today; for a list of coloring agents, see below. Black glass was called obsidianus after obsidian stone. A second method is apparently to produce a black glass which, when held to the light, will show the true color that this glass will give to another glass when used as a dye.

The Venetian ability to produce this superior form of glass resulted in a trade advantage over other glass producing lands. Murano’s reputation as a center for glassmaking was born when the Venetian Republic, fearing fire might burn down the city’s mostly wood buildings, ordered glassmakers to move their foundries to Murano in 1291. Murano's glassmakers were soon the island’s most prominent citizens. Glassmakers were not allowed to leave the Republic. Many took a risk and set up glass furnaces in surrounding cities and as far afield as England and the Netherlands.

==== Bohemia ====
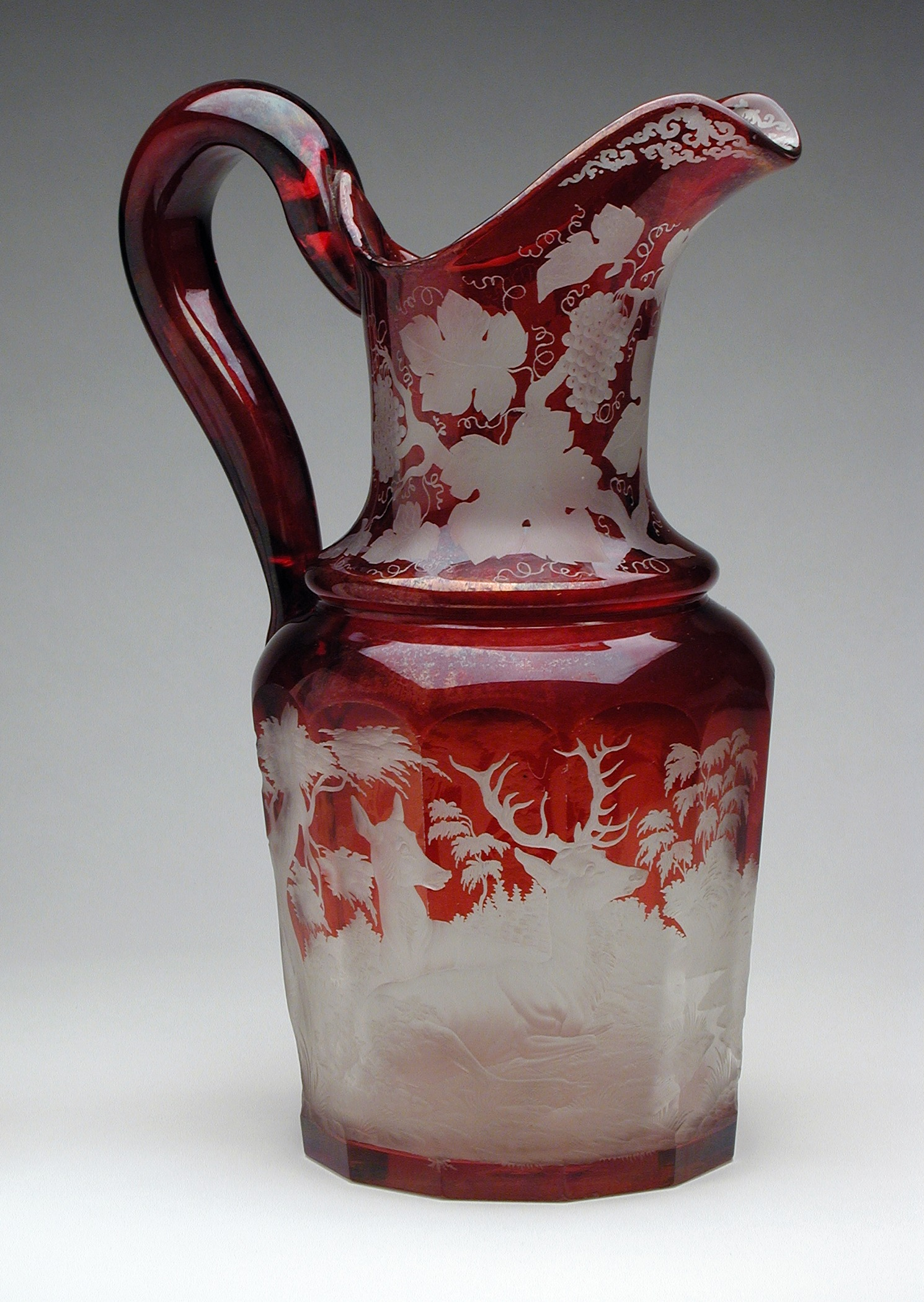
Bohemian flashed and engraved ruby glass (19th-century)

Bohemian glass, or Bohemia crystal, is a decorative glass produced in regions of Bohemia and Silesia, now in the current state of the Czech Republic, since the 13th century. Oldest archaeology excavations of glass-making sites date to around 1250 and are located in the Lusatian Mountains of Northern Bohemia. Most notable sites of glass-making throughout the ages are Skalice (German: Langenau), Kamenický Šenov (German: Steinschönau) and Nový Bor (German: Haida). Both Nový Bor and Kamenický Šenov have their own Glass Museums with many items dating since around 1600. It was especially outstanding in its manufacture of glass in high Baroque style from 1685 to 1750. In the 17th century, Caspar Lehmann, gem cutter to Emperor Rudolf II in Prague, adapted to glass the technique of gem engraving with copper and bronze wheels.

== Modern glass production ==
=== New processes ===
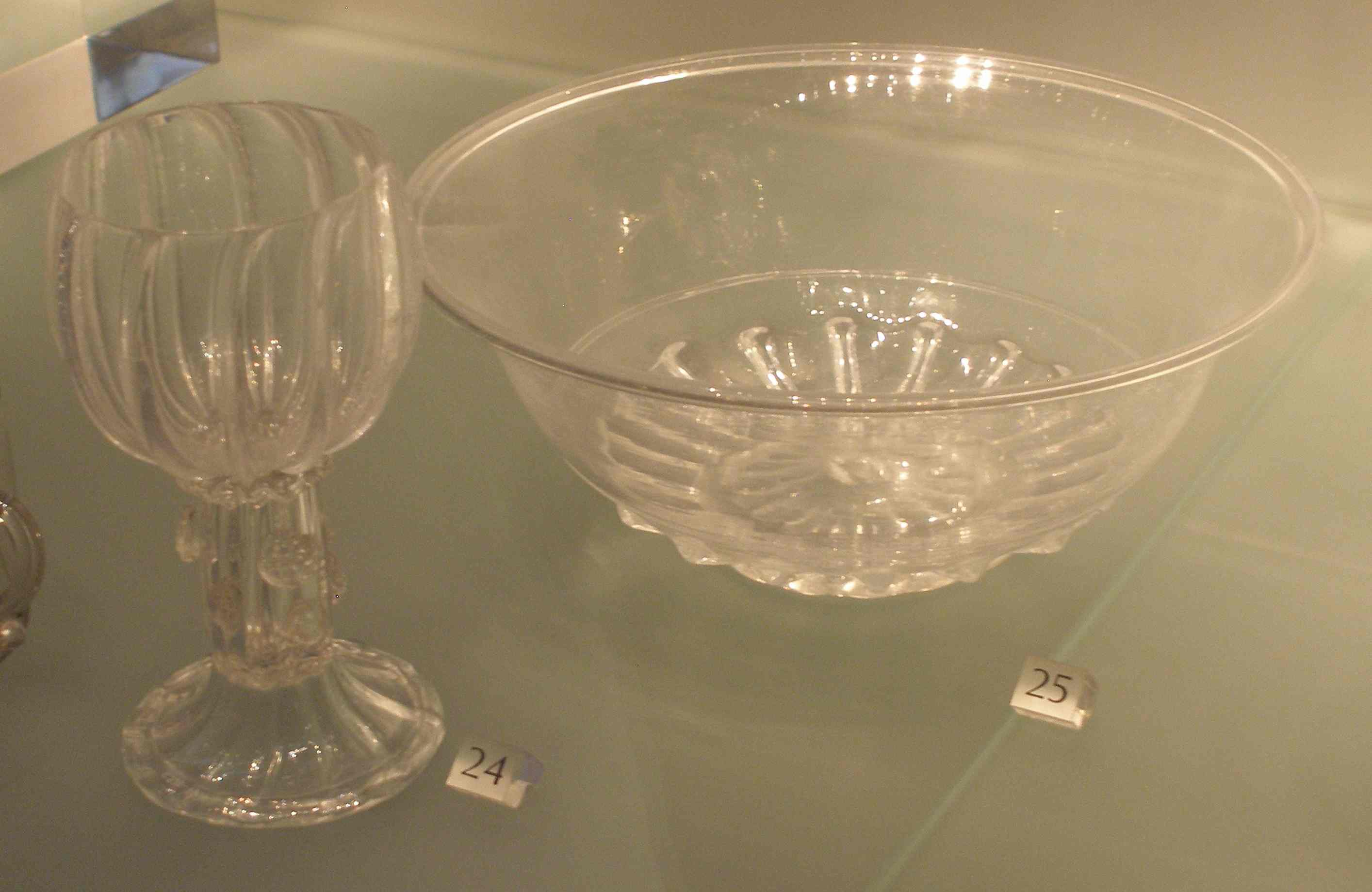
Examples of Ravenscroft's glass.

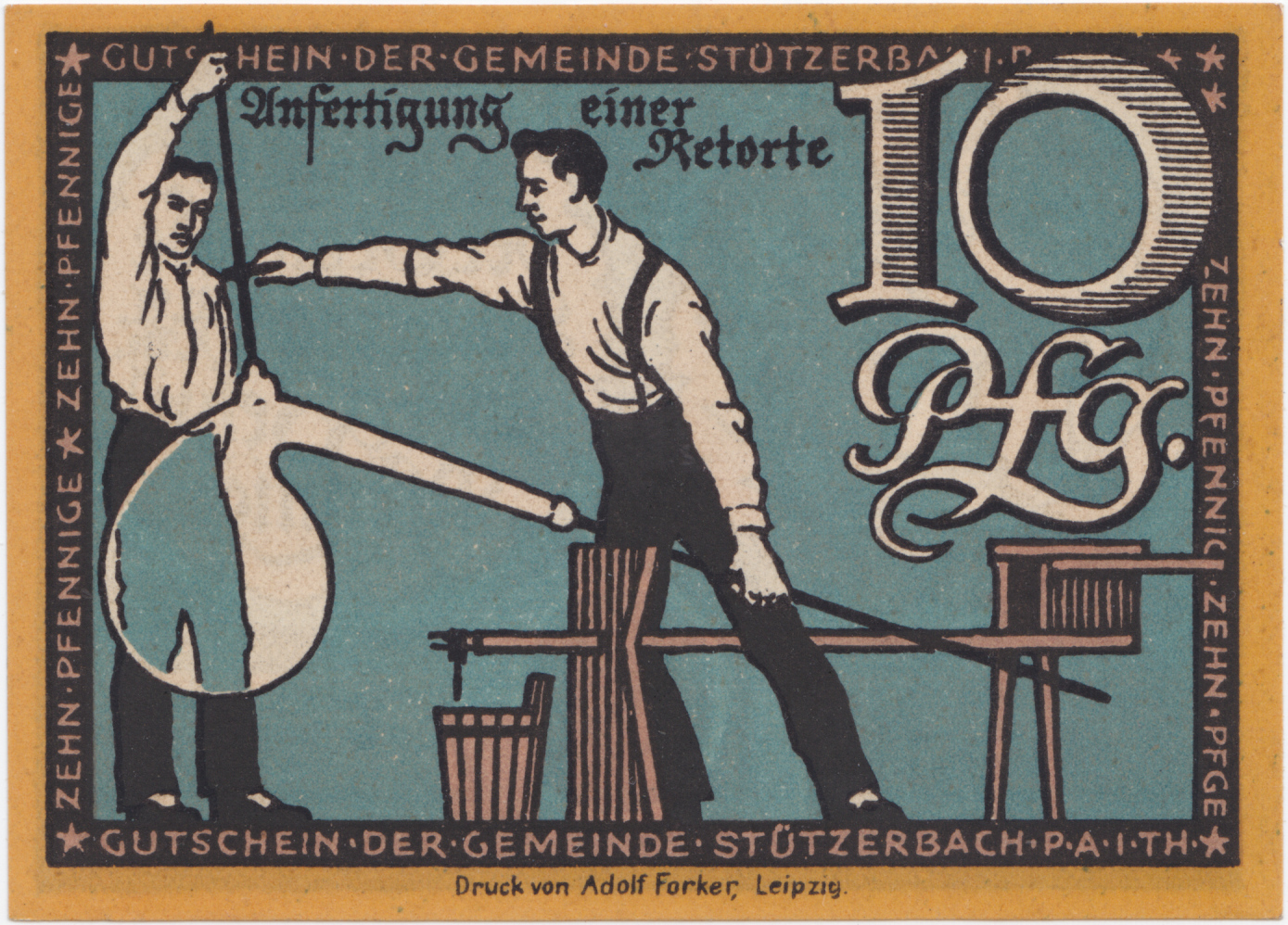
Glassblowers at work. Retort making.

A very important advance in glass manufacture was the technique of adding lead oxide to the molten glass; this improved the appearance of the glass and made it easier to melt using sea-coal as a furnace fuel. This technique also increased the "working period" of the glass, making it easier to manipulate. The process was first discovered by George Ravenscroft in 1674, who was the first to produce clear lead crystal glassware on an industrial scale. Ravenscroft had the cultural and financial resources necessary to revolutionise the glass trade, allowing England to overtake Venice as the centre of the glass industry in the eighteenth and nineteenth centuries. Seeking to find an alternative to Venetian cristallo, he used flint as a silica source, but his glasses tended to crizzle, developing a network of small cracks destroying its transparency. This was eventually overcome by replacing some of the potash flux with lead oxide to the melt.

He was granted a protective patent in where production and refinement moved from his glasshouse on the Savoy to the seclusion of Henley-on-Thames.

By 1696, after the patent expired, twenty-seven glasshouses in England were producing flint glass and were exporting all over Europe with such success that, in 1746, the British Government imposed a lucrative tax on it. Rather than drastically reduce the lead content of their glass, manufacturers responded by creating highly decorated, smaller, more delicate forms, often with hollow stems, known to collectors today as Excise glasses. The British glass making industry was able to take off with the repeal of the tax in 1845.

Evidence of the use of the blown plate glass method dates back to 1620 in London and was used for mirrors and coach plates. Louis Lucas de Nehou and A. Thevart perfected the process of casting polished plate glass in 1688 in France. Prior to this invention, mirror plates, made from blown "sheet" glass, had been limited in size. De Nehou's process of rolling molten glass poured on an iron table rendered the manufacture of very large plates possible. This method of production was adopted by the English in 1773 at Ravenhead. The polishing process was industrialized around 1800 with the adoption of a steam engine to carry out the grinding and polishing of the cast glass.

=== Industrial production ===
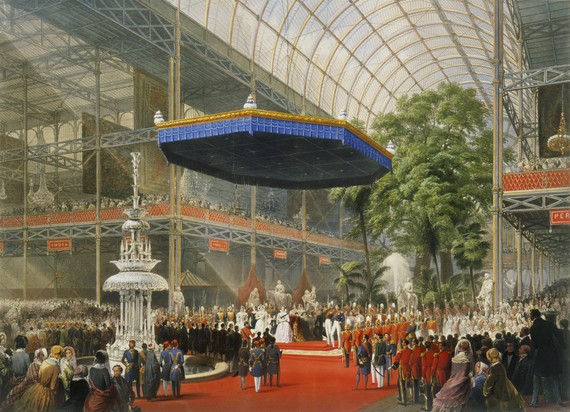
The façade of the Crystal Palace, one of the first buildings to use glass as the main material for construction.

The use of glass as a building material was heralded by The Crystal Palace of 1851, built by Joseph Paxton to house the Great Exhibition. Paxton's revolutionary new building inspired the public use of glass as a material for domestic and horticultural architecture. In 1832, the British Crown Glass Company (later Chance Brothers) became the first company to adopt the cylinder method to produce sheet glass with the expertise of Georges Bontemps, a famous French glassmaker. (Note: This process was used extensively until early in the 20th Century to make window glass.) This glass was produced by blowing long cylinders of glass, which were then cut along the length and then flattened onto a cast-iron table, before being annealed. Plate glass involves the glass being ladled onto a cast-iron bed, where it is rolled into a sheet with an iron roller. The sheet, still soft, is pushed into the open mouth of an annealing tunnel or temperature-controlled oven called a lehr, down which it was carried by a system of rollers. James Hartley introduced the Rolled Plate method in 1847. This allowed a ribbed finish and was often used for extensive glass roofs such as within railway stations.

An early advance in automating glass manufacturing was patented in 1821 by Henry Ricketts and in 1848 by the engineer Henry Bessemer, both of Britain. Ricketts patented a glass moulding machine while Bessemer's system produced a continuous ribbon of flat glass by forming the ribbon between rollers. This was an expensive process, as the surfaces of the glass needed polishing and was later abandoned by its sponsor, Robert Lucas Chance of Chance Brothers, as unviable. Bessemer also introduced an early form of "Float Glass" in 1843, which involved pouring glass onto liquid tin.

In 1887, the mass production of glass was developed by the firm Ashley in Castleford, Yorkshire. This semi-automatic process used machines that were capable of producing 200 standardized bottles per hour, many times quicker than the traditional methods of manufacture. Chance Brothers also introduced the machine rolled patterned glass method in 1888.

In 1898, Pilkington invented Wired Cast glass, where the glass incorporates a strong steel-wire mesh for safety and security. This was commonly given the misnomer "Georgian Wired Glass" but it greatly post-dates the Georgian era. The machine drawn cylinder technique was invented in the US and was the first mechanical method for the drawing of window glass. It was manufactured under licence in the UK by Pilkington from 1910 onwards.

In 1938, the polished plate process was improved by Pilkington which incorporated a double grinding process to give an improved quality to the finish. Between 1953 and 1957, Sir Alastair Pilkington and Kenneth Bickerstaff of the UK's Pilkington Brothers developed the revolutionary float glass process, the first successful commercial application for forming a continuous ribbon of glass using a molten tin bath on which the molten glass flows unhindered under the influence of gravity. This method gave the sheet uniform thickness and very flat surfaces. Modern windows are made from float glass. Most float glass is soda–lime glass, but relatively minor quantities of specialty borosilicate and flat panel display glass are also produced using the float glass process. The success of this process lay in the careful balance of the volume of glass fed onto the bath, where it was flattened by its own weight. Full scale profitable sales of float glass were first achieved in 1960.

== Gallery ==
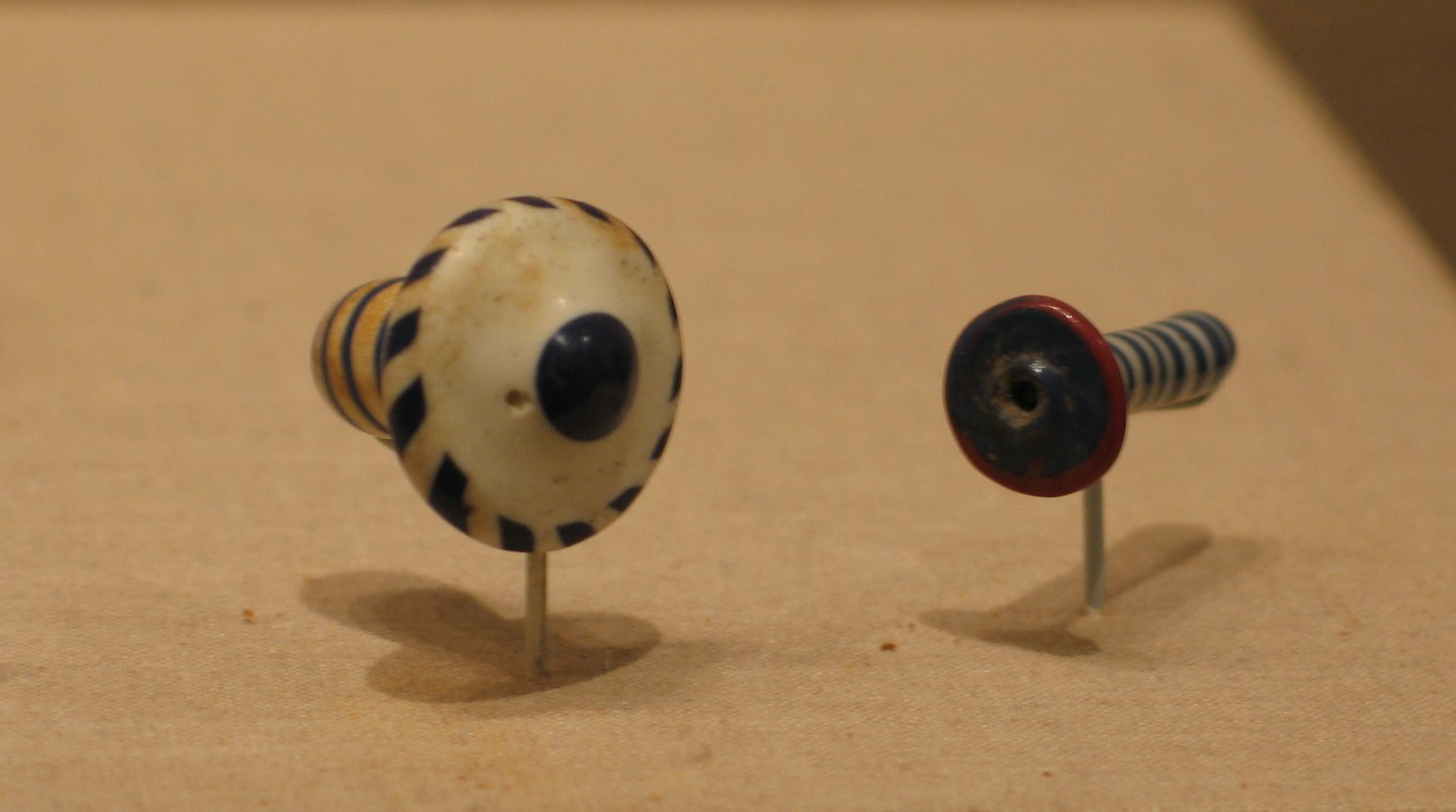
Glass ear stud, c. 1390–1353 BC, 48.66.30, Brooklyn Museum

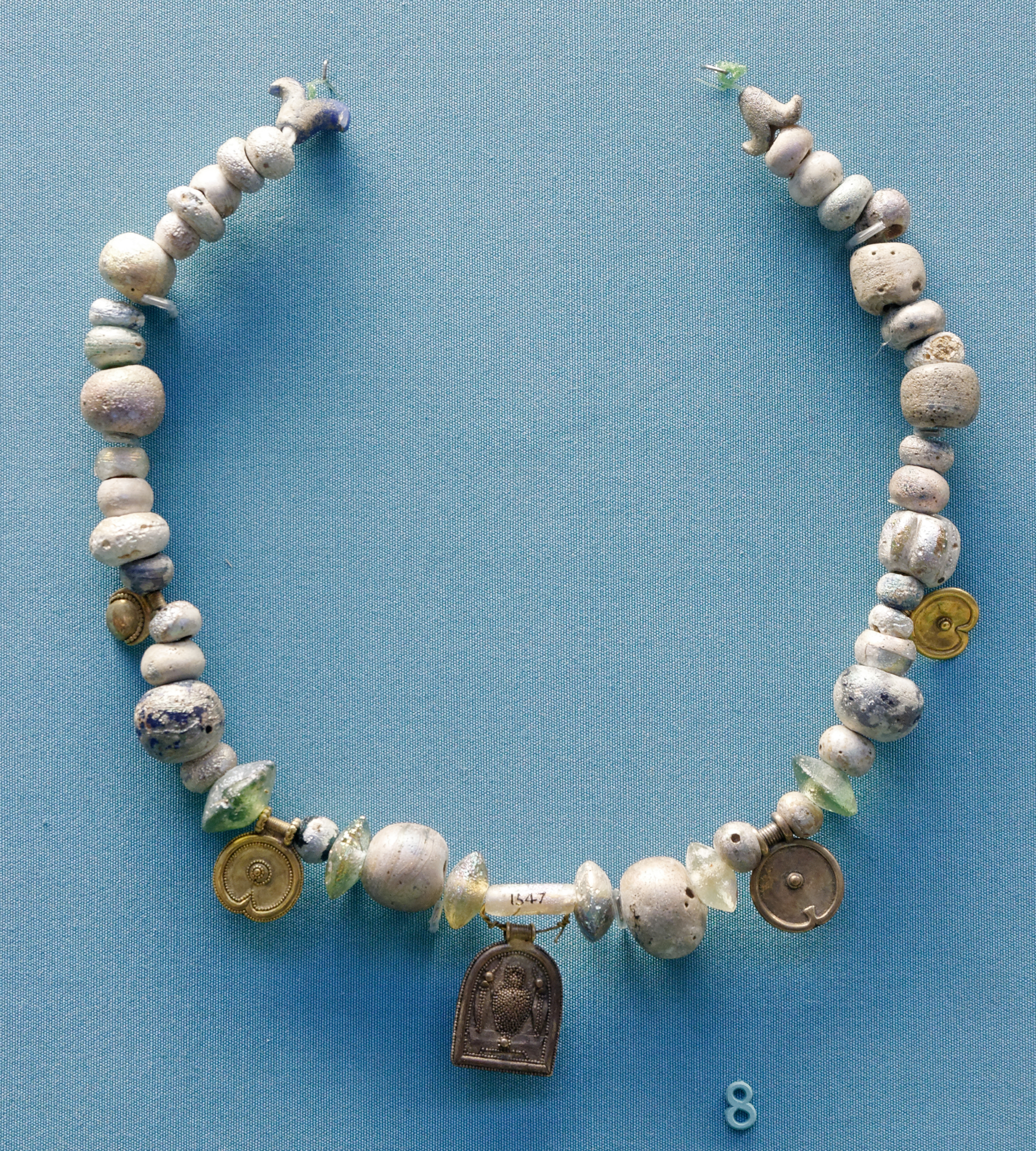
Phoenician glass necklace 5th–6th century BC

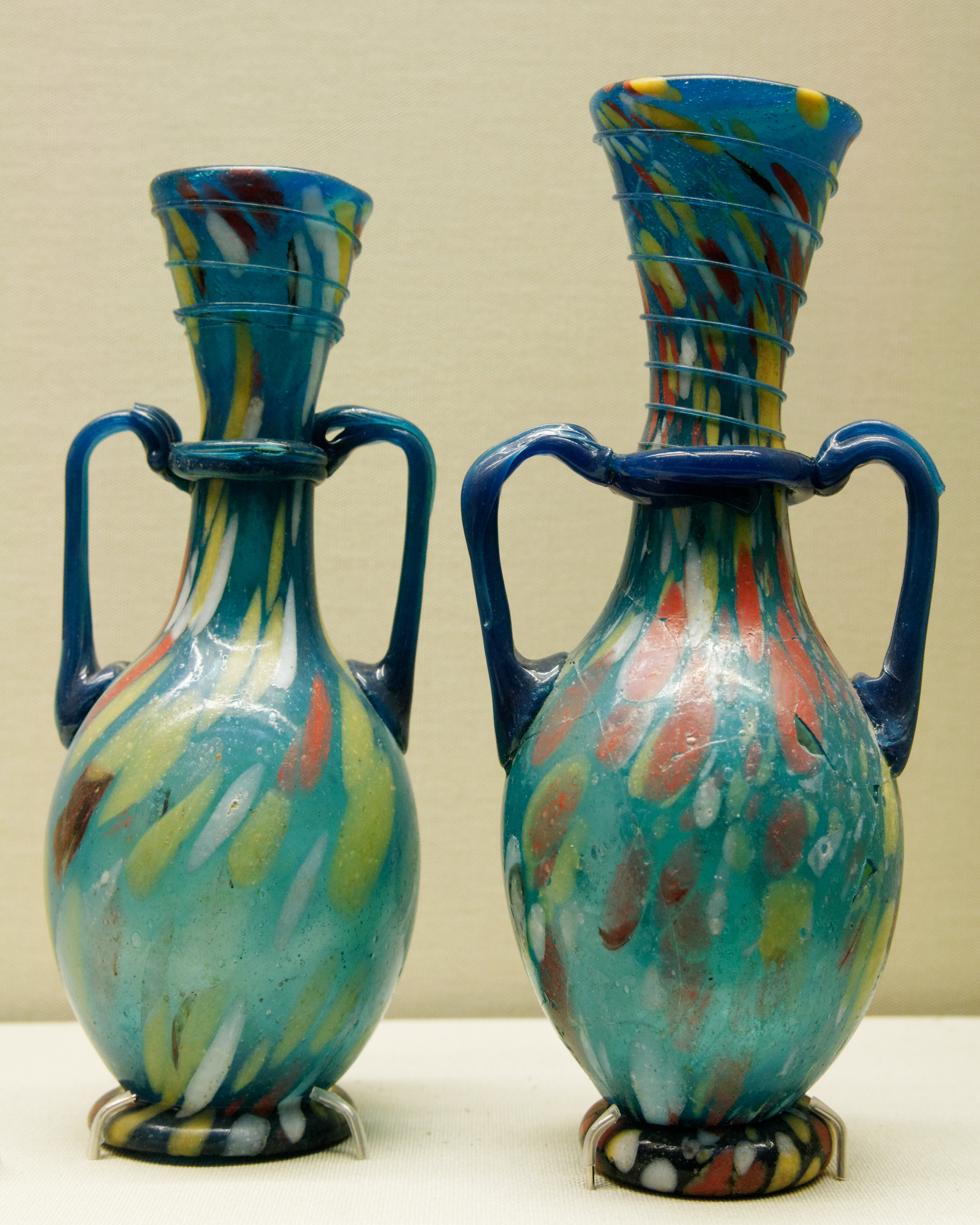
Roman glass amphoriskoi 1st–2nd century AD

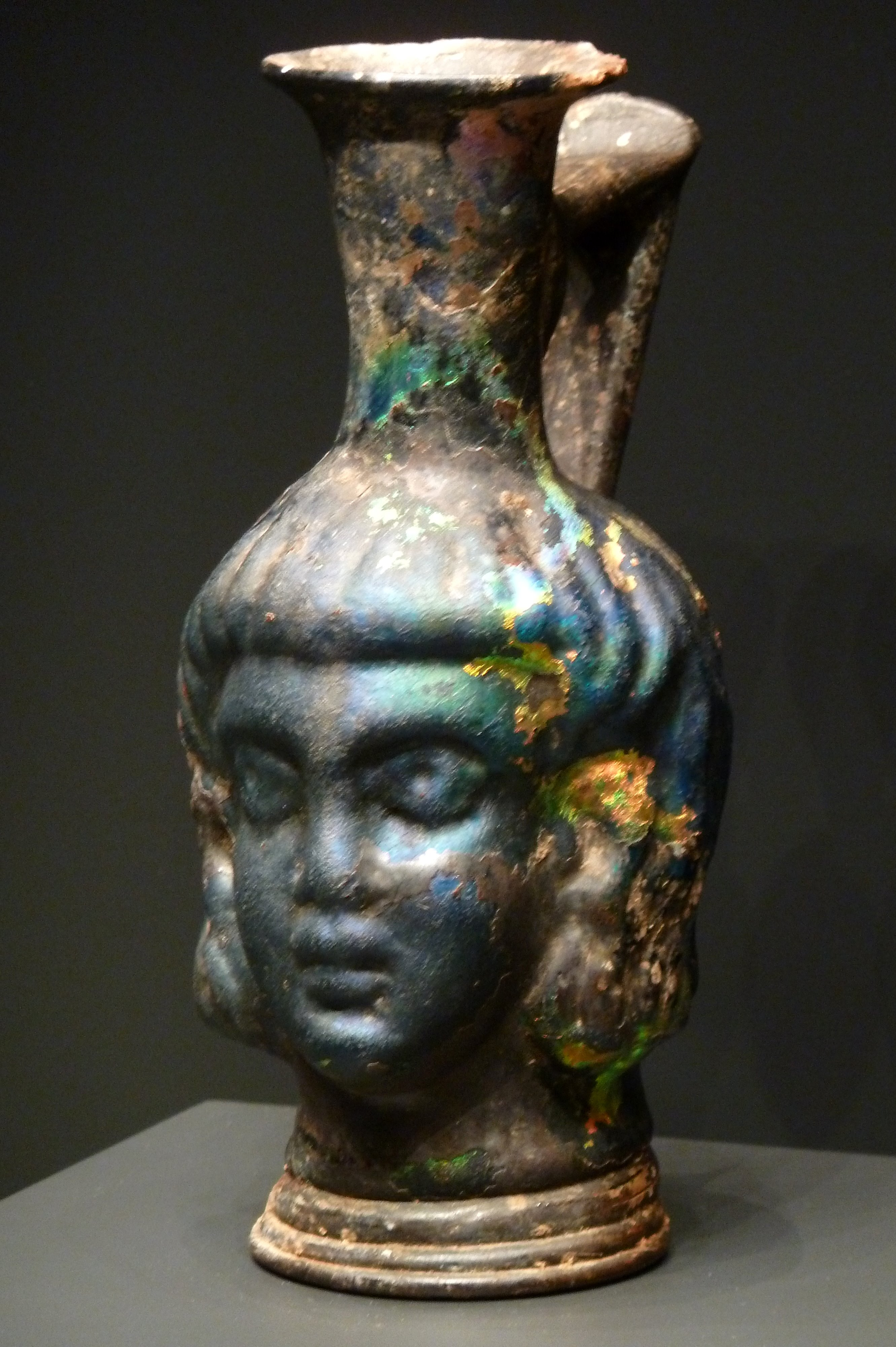
Blue head flask (Roman, AD 300–500, cast glass)

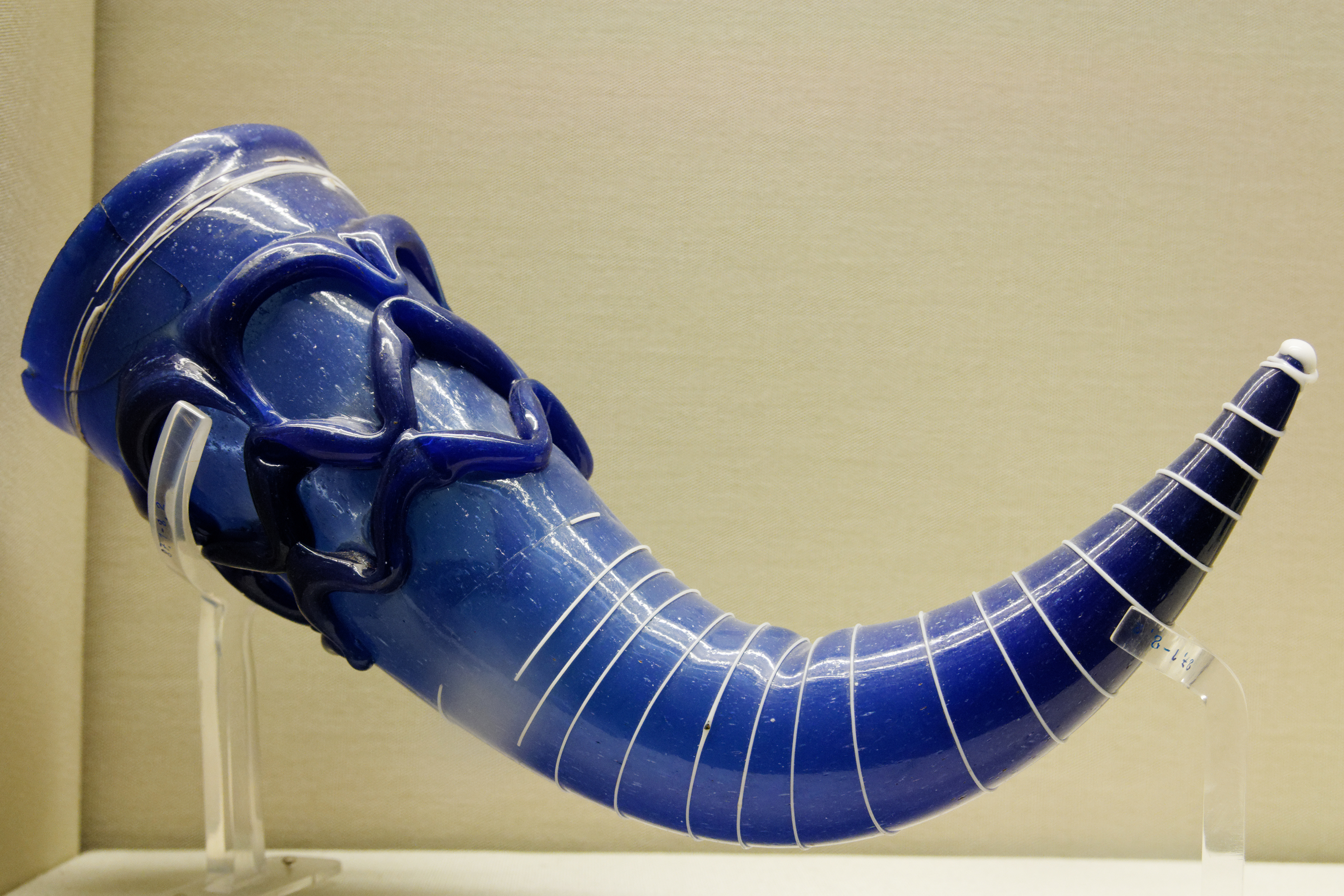
Lombardic glass drinking horn 6th–7th century AD

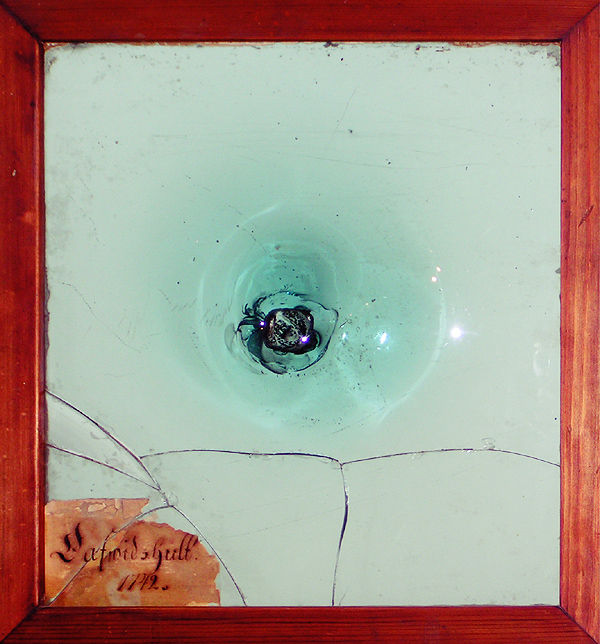
Mouth-blown window-glass in Sweden Kosta Glasbruk, (1742) with a pontil mark from the glassblower's pipe

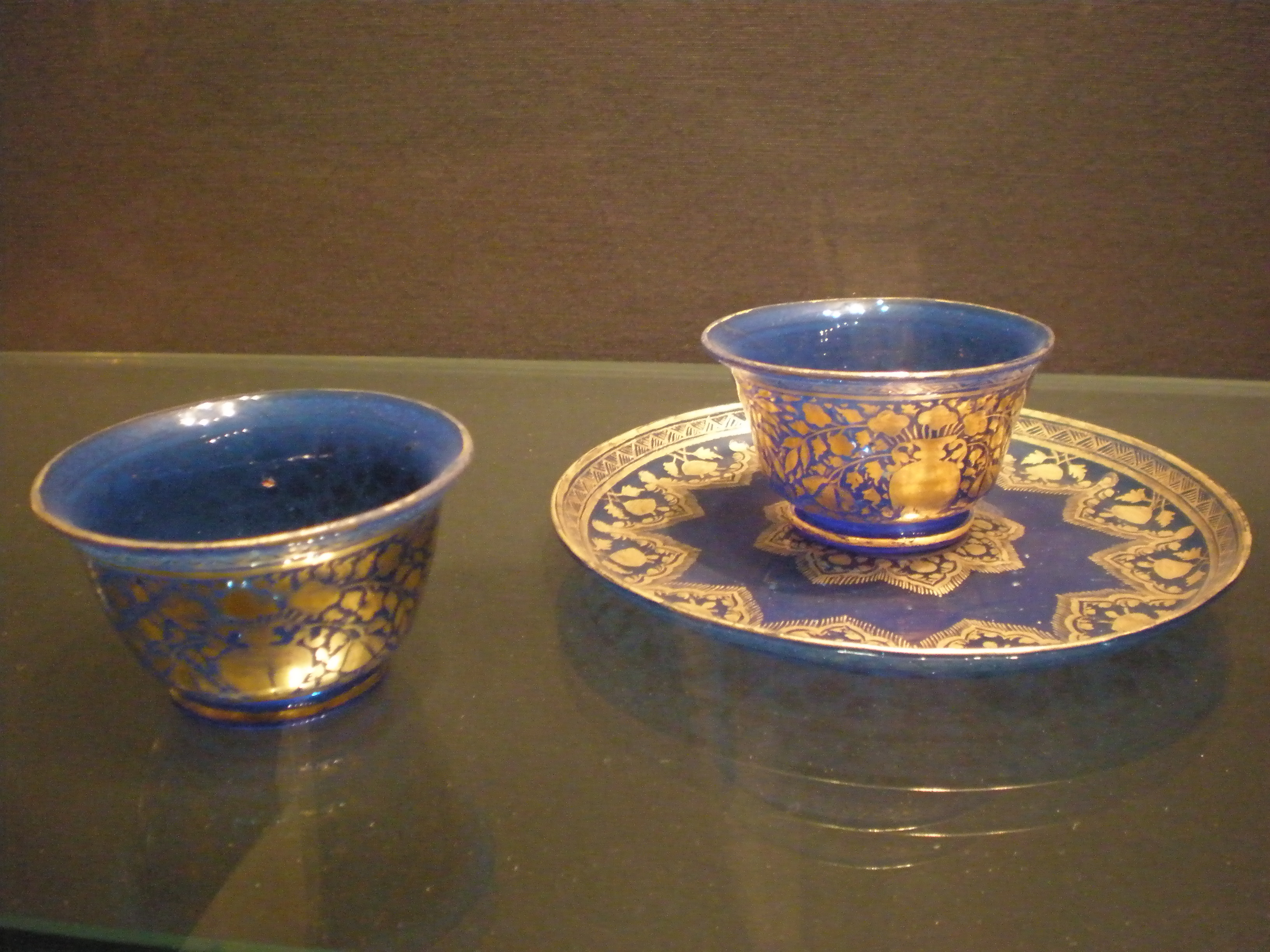
Two cups cobalt blue glass with gilt floral decoration from India, Mughal, circa 1700–1775

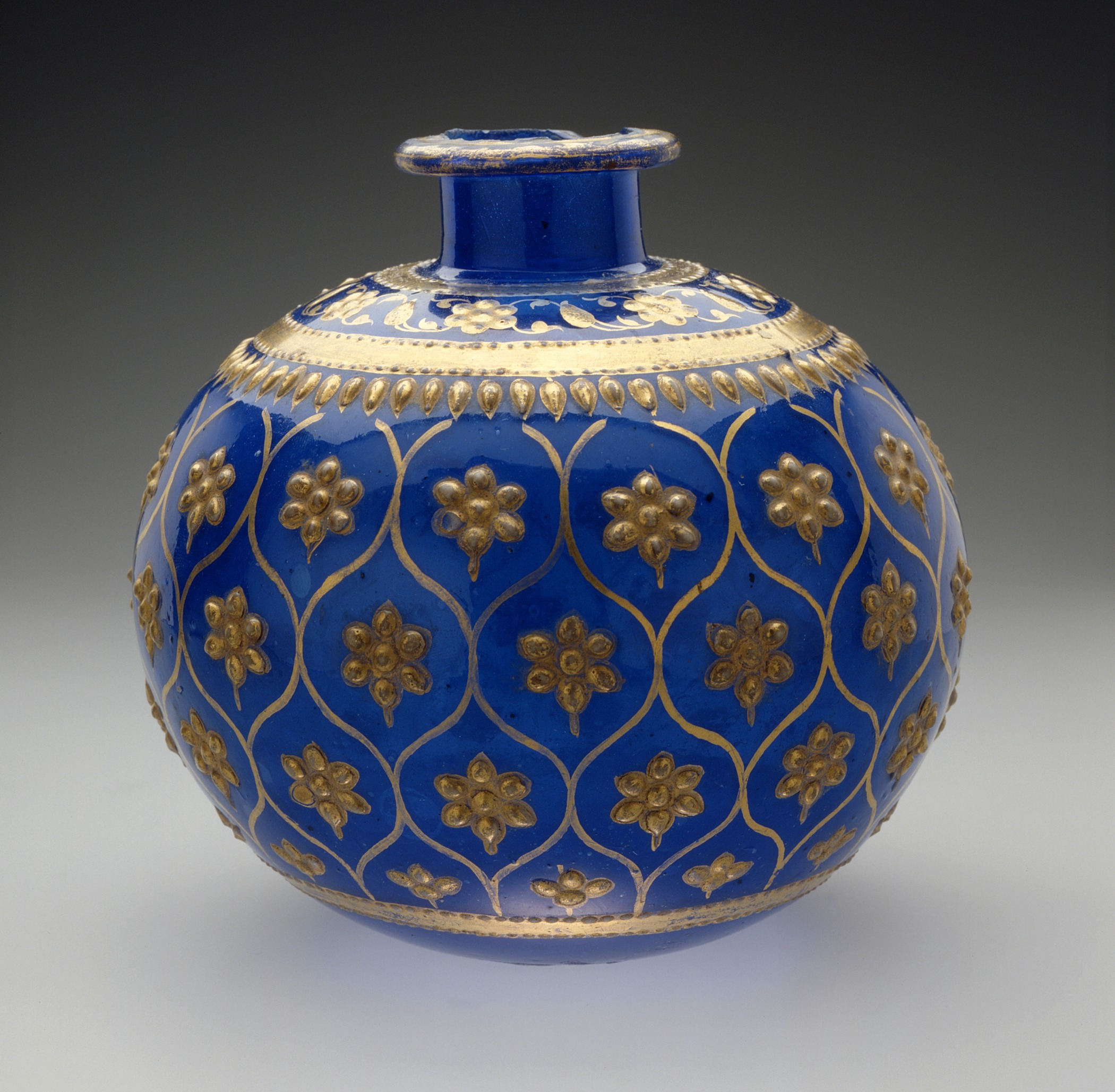
Base for a water pipe, India, Mughal, c. 1700–1775

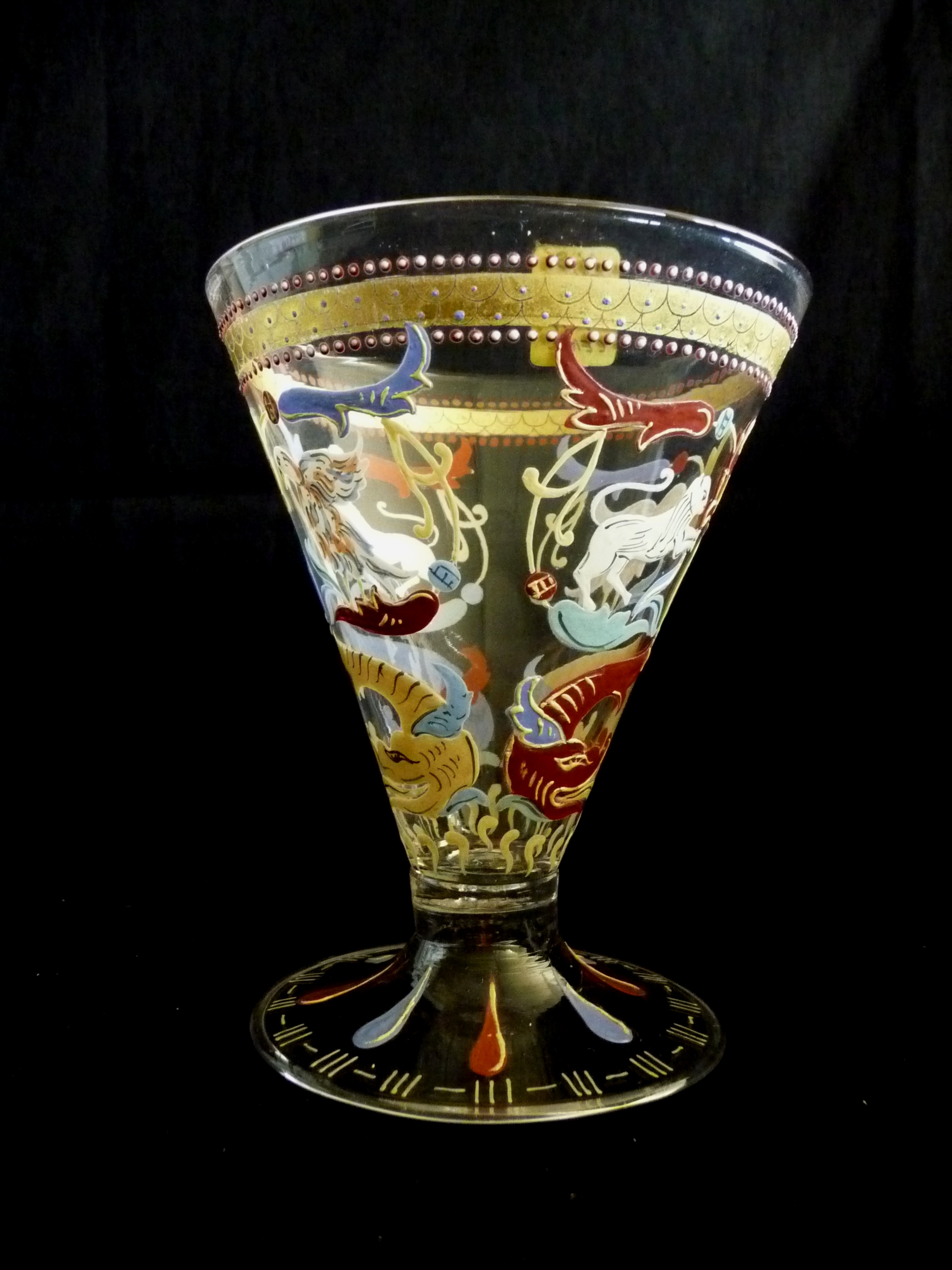
Venetian goblet made in Italy in the early 19th century

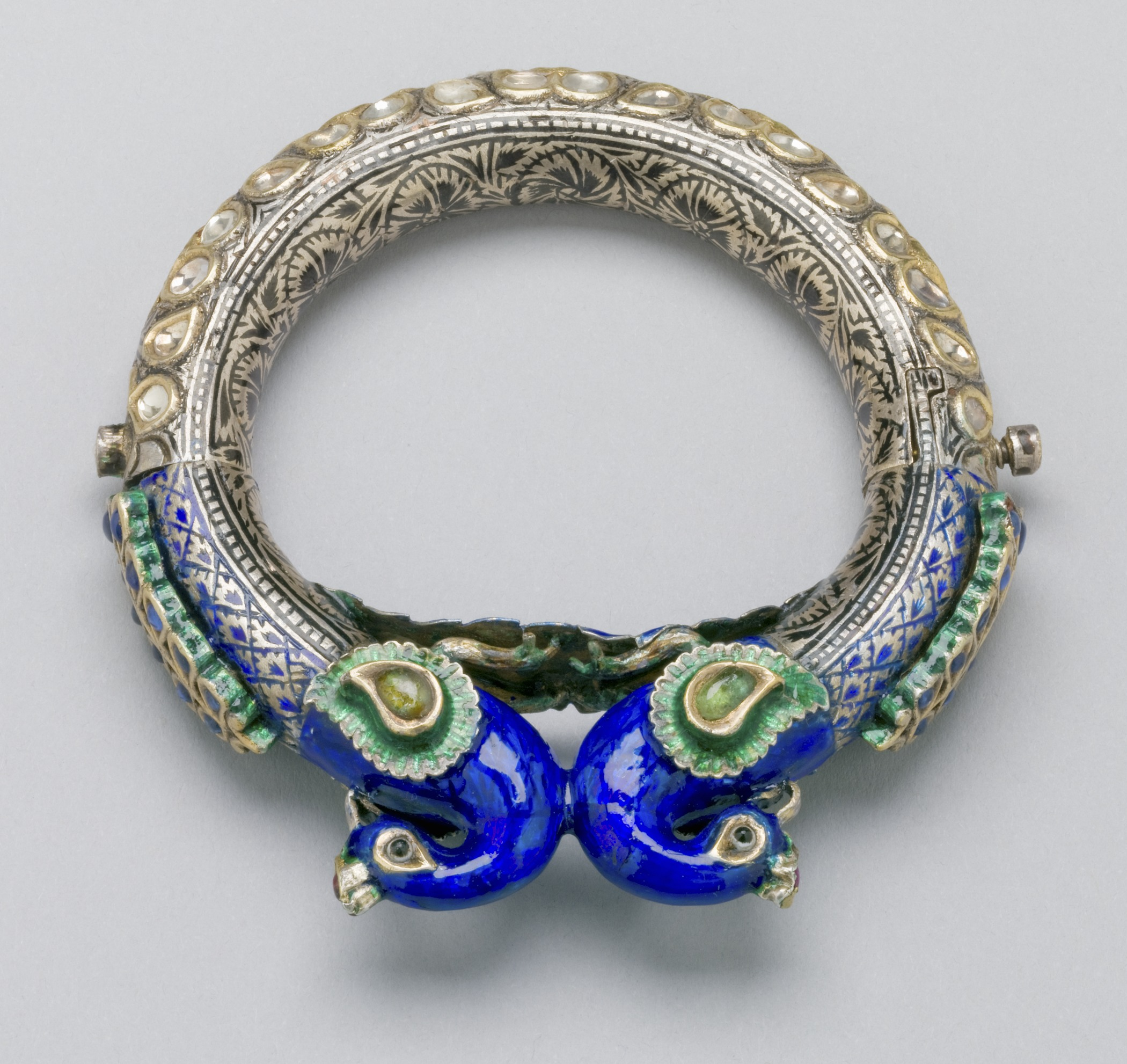
Bracelets with peacocks, Delhi, enameled silver inlaid with gemstones and glass, 19th century

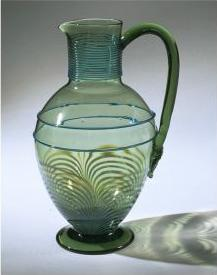
Jug, 1876, James Powell & Sons

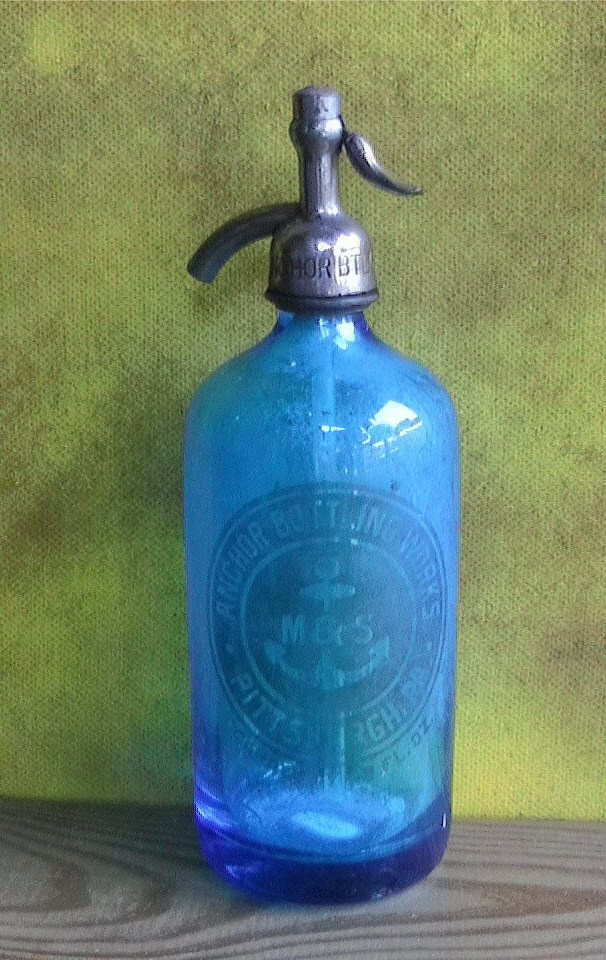
Siphon bottle for seltzer water, 1922

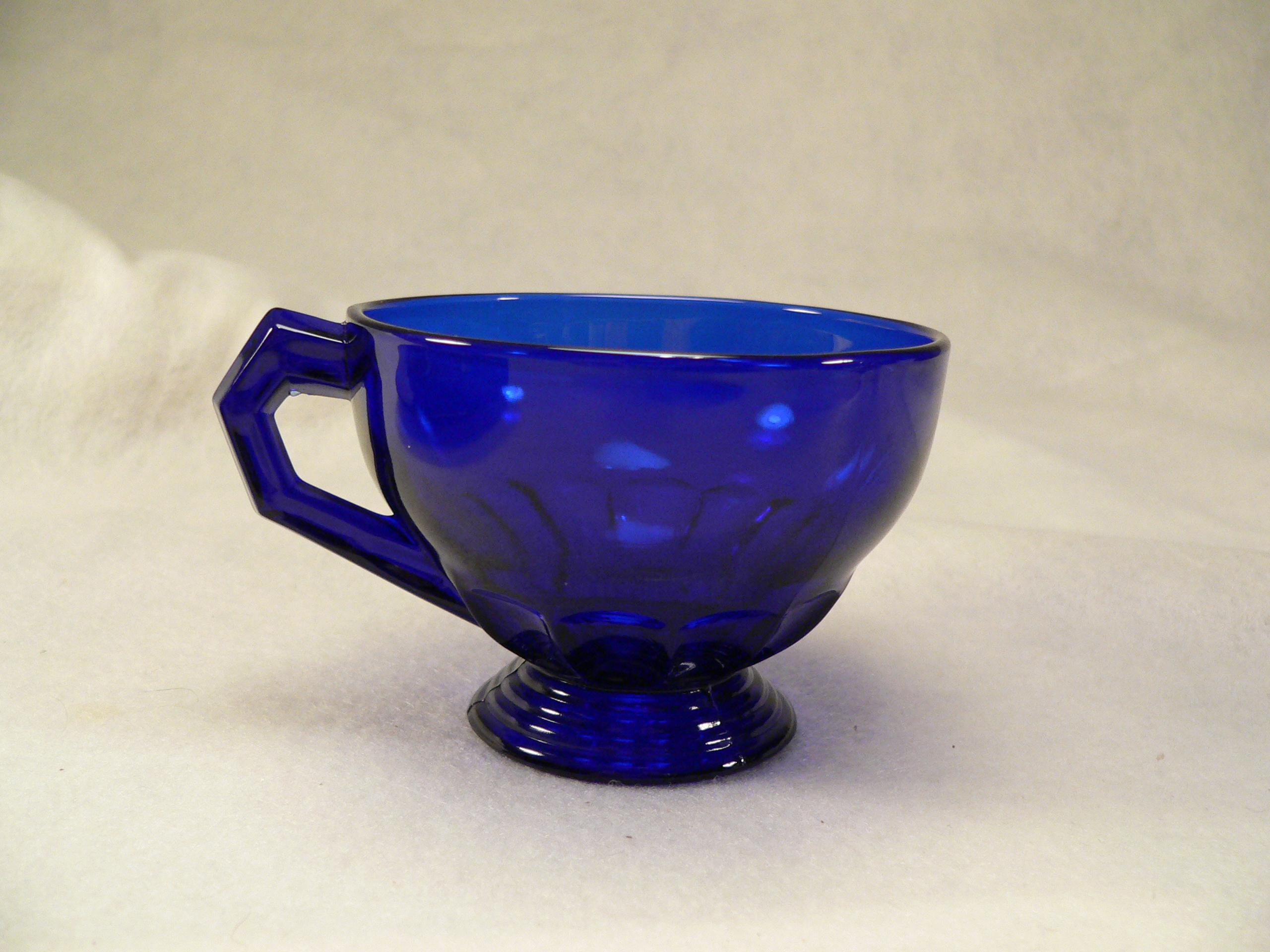
New Martinsville Glass Hostmaster Tea Cup, cobalt blue, 1930

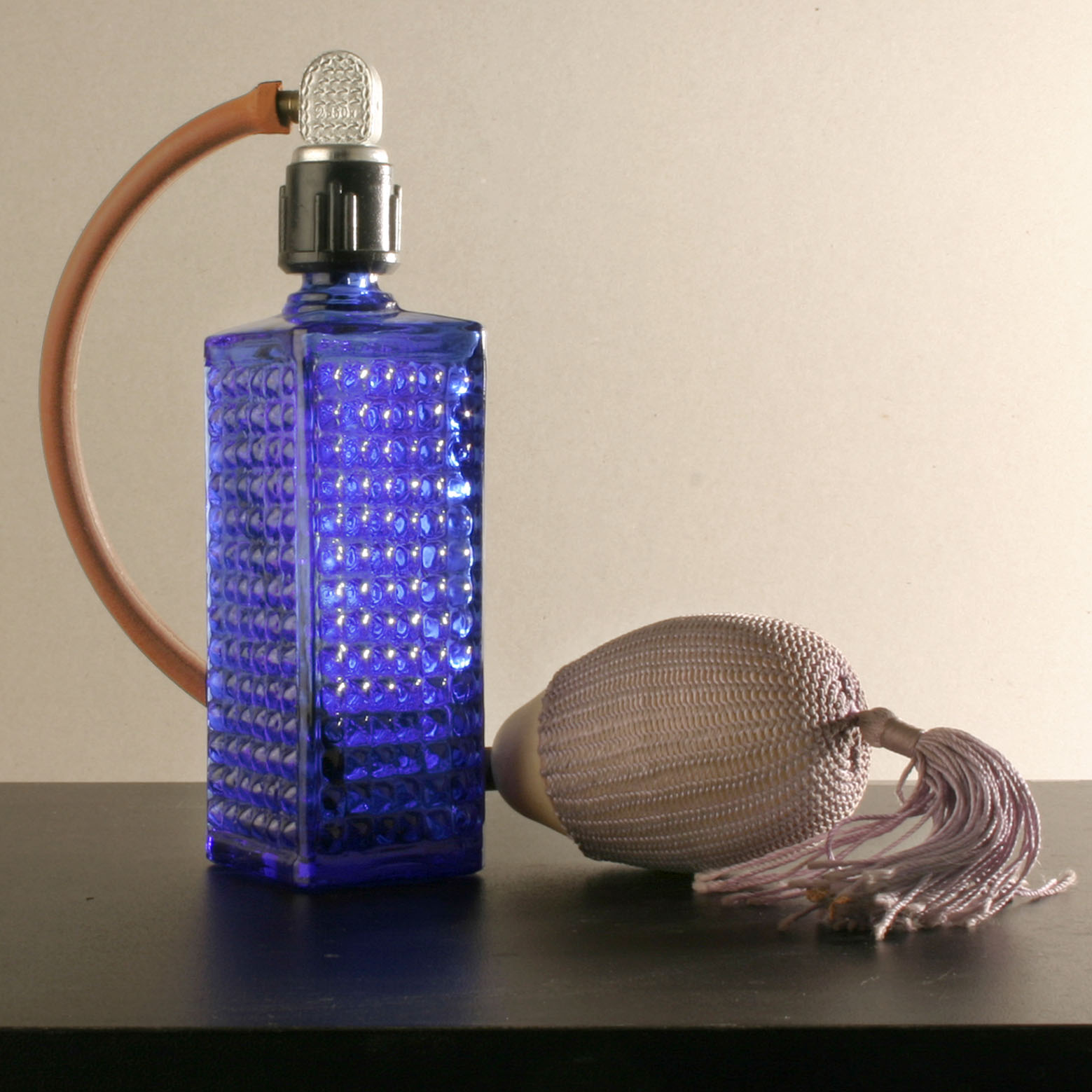
Perfume set from Soviet Union, c. 1965

== See also ==
- Early glassmaking in the United States
- 18th century glassmaking in the United States
