= Machine drawn cylinder sheet glass =

Glass production technique

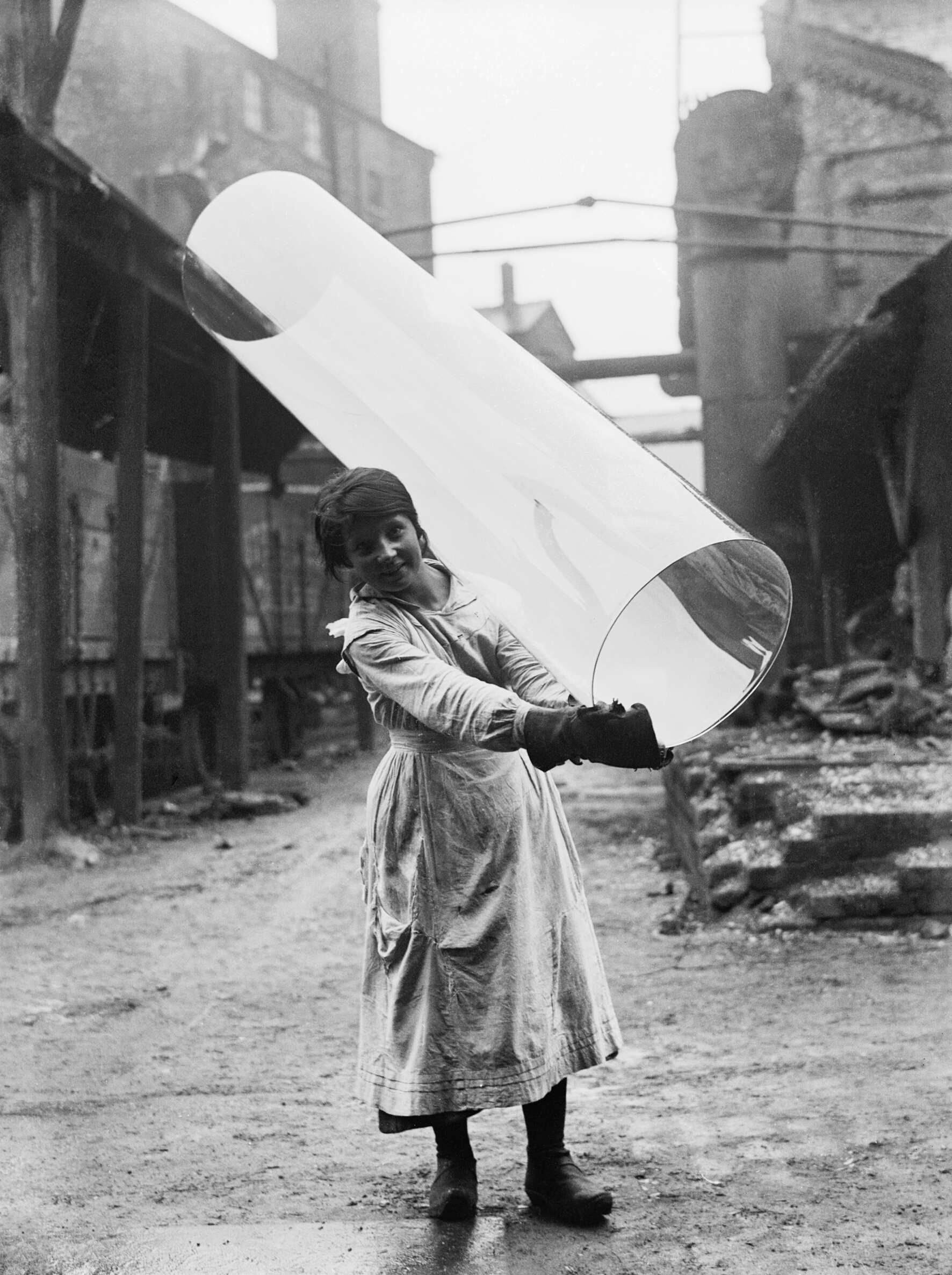
A Lancashire factory worker with a cylinder of glass (1918)

Machine drawn cylinder sheet was the first mechanical method for "drawing" window glass. Cylinders of glass 40 feet (12 m) high are drawn vertically from a circular tank. The glass is then annealed and cut into 7-to-10-foot (2.1 to 3.0 m) cylinders. These are cut lengthways, reheated, and flattened.

This process was invented in the US in 1903. This type of glass was manufactured in the early 20th century (it was manufactured in the United Kingdom by Pilkington from 1910 to 1933).

Other historical methods for making window glass included broad sheet, blown plate, crown glass, polished plate and cylinder blown sheet. These methods of manufacture lasted at least until the end of the 19th century. The early 20th century marks the move away from hand-blown to machine manufactured glass such as rolled plate, flat drawn sheet, single and twin ground polished plate and float glass.

== Sources ==
- "Hand-blown glass: manufacturing process". London Crown Glass Company. Archived from the original on November 6, 2005.
