= Crown glass =

Crown glass is either of two kinds of glass:

- Crown glass (window) was a type of hand-blown window glass.
- Crown glass (optics) is a type of optical glass used in lenses.
