= Polished plate glass =

Polished plate is a type of hand-made glass. It is produced by casting glass onto a table and subsequently grinding and polishing the glass. This was originally done by hand, and then later by machine. It was an expensive process requiring a large capital investment.

Other methods of producing hand-blown window glass included: broad sheet, blown plate, crown glass and cylinder blown sheet. These methods of manufacture lasted at least until the end of the 19th century. The early 20th century marks the move away from hand-blown to machine manufactured glass such as rolled plate, machine drawn cylinder sheet, flat drawn sheet, polished plate glass, and float glass.

In 1688, the Frenchman Louis Lucas de Nehou, in conjunction with Abraham Thevart, succeeded in perfecting the process of casting plate-glass. Mirror plates prior to the invention had been made from blown "sheet" glass, and were consequently very limited in size. De Nehou's process of rolling molten glass poured on an iron table rendered the manufacture of very large plates possible.

In 1773 English polished plate (by the French process) was produced at Ravenhead.

By 1800 a steam engine was used to carry out the grinding and polishing of the cast glass.
