= Crown glass (window) =

Early type of window glass

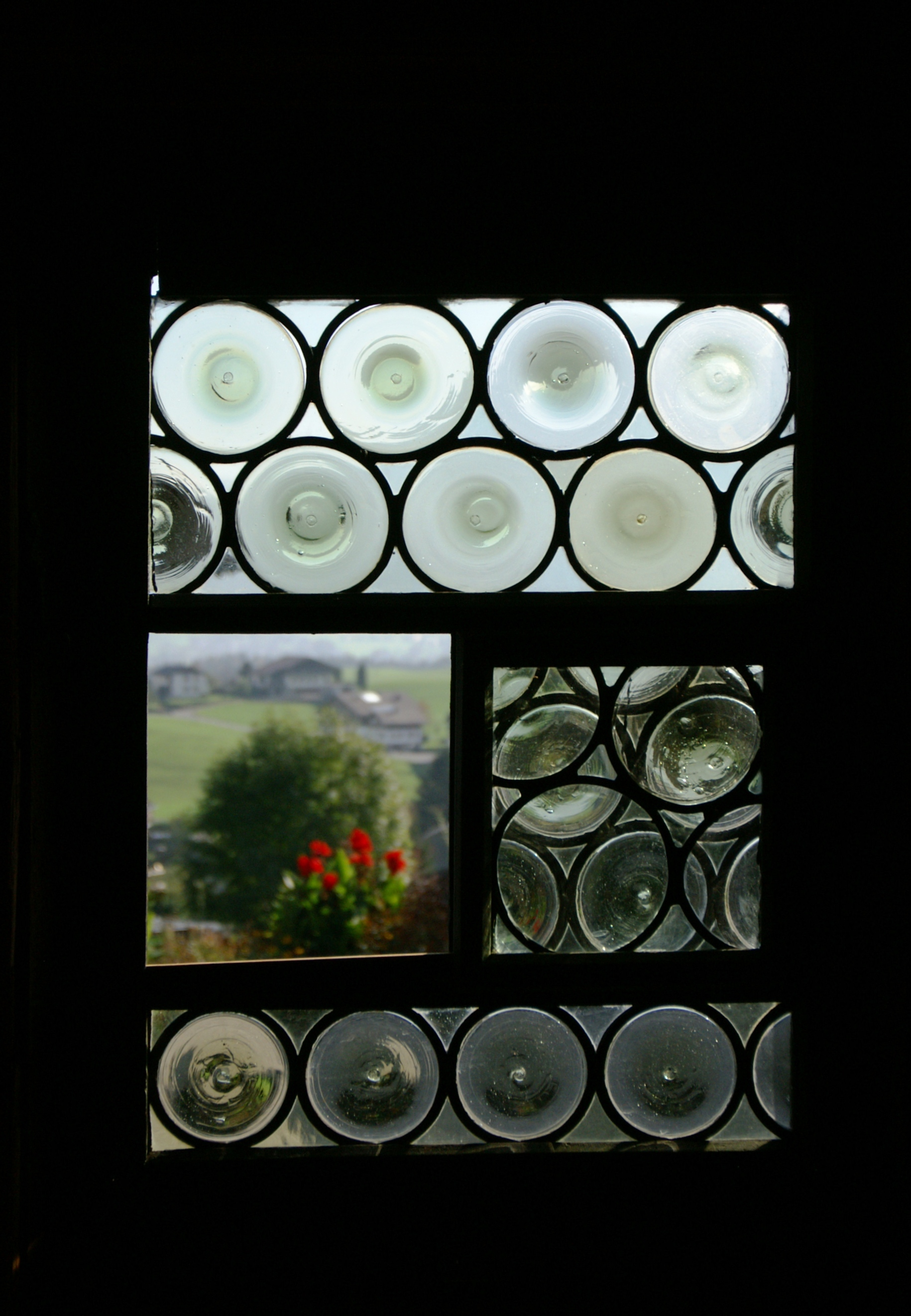
Crown glass window, with the "bullseye" (center portion) deliberately used for artistic effect

Crown glass is a type of hand-blown glass that was used in windows prior to the development of sheet window glass production.

== Window glass types ==
Crown glass is one of many types of hand-blown glass used in windows. Other methods include: broad sheet, blown plate, polished plate and cylinder blown sheet. These methods of manufacture lasted at least until the end of the 19th century. The early 20th century marks the move away from hand-blown to machine-manufactured glass such as rolled plate, machine drawn cylinder sheet, drawn sheet, single and twin ground polished plate and float glass.

== History ==
Originally thought to have been first developed in Medieval times, crown glass may date back to Roman times. Crown glass window panes with ceramic frames have been found at Soba East, the medieval capital of Alodia. These are only 110–115 millimetres (4.3–4.5 in) in diameter and were probably used to provide light in storerooms. The medieval glass centers of Venice and Normandy were major producers of crown glass in Europe and kept their methods as a trade secret. However, from Normandy the crown glass technique made its way to England in the 17th century.

Crown glass was one of the two most common processes for making window glass until the 19th century. The other was blown plate.

== Manufacture ==
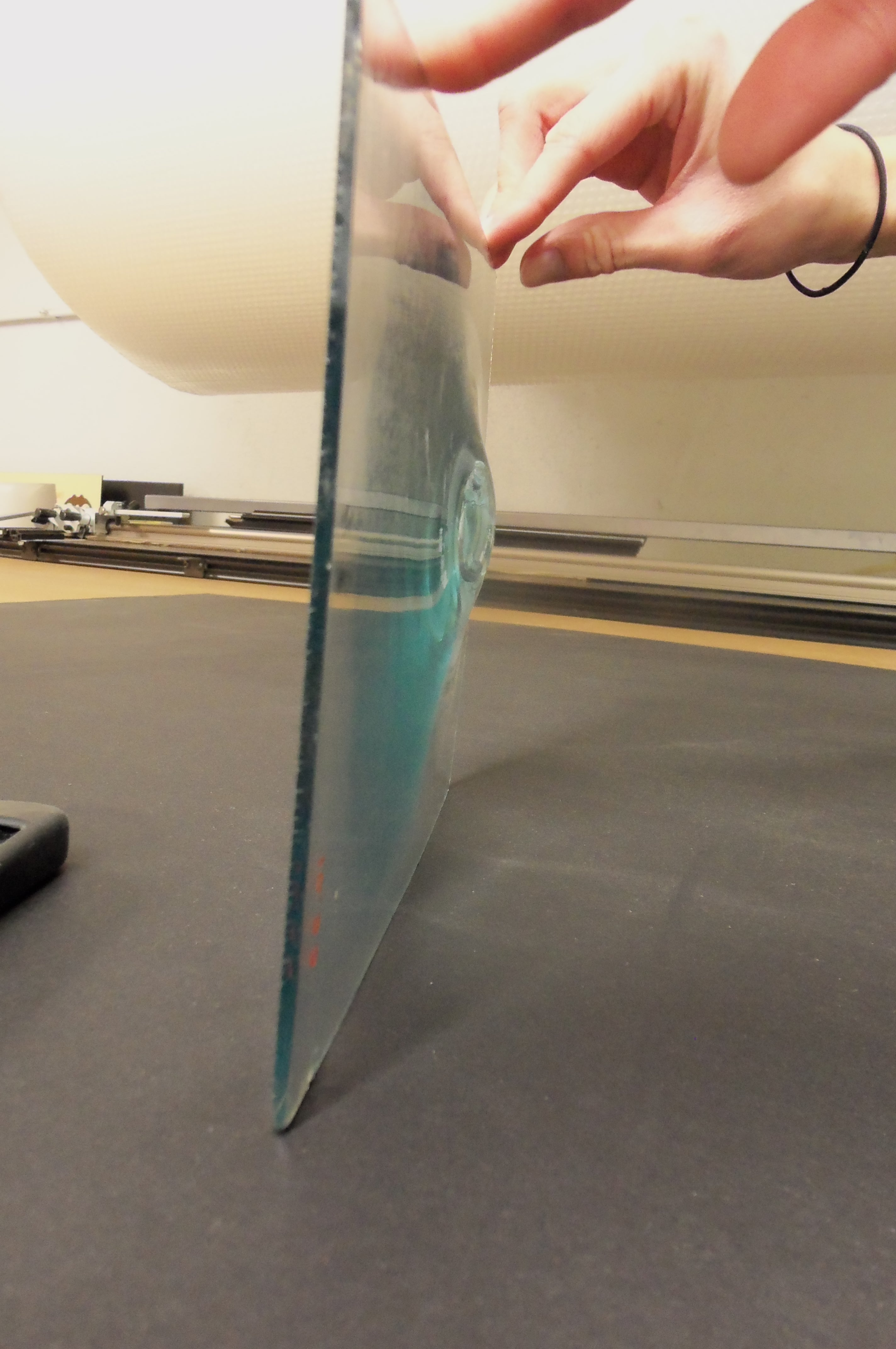
A pane of crown glass, viewed side-on

In the crown glass process, glass was blown into a "crown" or hollow globe. This was then transferred from the blowpipe to a punty and then flattened by reheating and spinning out the bowl-shaped piece of glass (bullion) into a flat disk by centrifugal force, up to as much as 5 or 6 feet (1.5 to 1.8 metres) in diameter. The glass was then cut to the sizes and shapes required for the glazing of windows.

The thinnest glass was in a band at the edge of the disk, with the glass becoming thicker and more opaque toward the center. Known as a bullseye, the thicker center area around the pontil mark was used for less expensive windows. To fill large window spaces with the best glass, many small rectangular shapes were cut from the edge of the disk, and then some might be halved into triangles. These were mounted in a lead lattice work and fitted into the window frame.
