= Blown plate glass =

Handmade glass

Blown plate is a type of hand-blown glass that was used to produce glass segments, mainly for mirrors and carriages, and occasionally for use in windows in buildings.

== Production ==
Blown plate was made by hand-grinding broad sheet glass. As the process was labour-intensive, and expensive, blown plate was mainly used for carriages and mirrors rather than in windows for buildings. Other methods for making hand-blown glass included: broad sheet, crown glass, polished plate and cylinder blown sheet. These methods of manufacture lasted at least until the end of the 19th century. The early 20th century marked the move away from hand-blown to machine manufactured glass such as rolled plate, machine drawn cylinder sheet, flat drawn sheet, single and twin ground polished plate and float glass.
