= Overflow downdraw method =

Method of producing flat glass

Illustration of the apparatus for the overflow downdraw glass forming method

The overflow downdraw method or fusion method is a technique for producing flat glass. A sheet of glass is formed when molten glass overflows from a supply trough, flows down both sides, and rejoins (fuses) at the tapered bottom, where it is drawn away in sheet form.

The key advantage of this technique as compared to the float glass process is that the pristine surfaces are not touched by molten tin. The technique is used for the production of very thin flat panel display glass by the companies Asahi Glass Co., Corning, Nippon Electric Glass, Samsung Corning Precision Materials, and various other companies operating in the field of display glass and other types of thin glass.

The fusion method was originally conceived by Corning in the 1960s as a method for manufacturing automotive windshields. Shelved for years, the technology was reintroduced to supply the flat screen display market.
