= Cylinder blown sheet glass =

Type of hand-blown glass

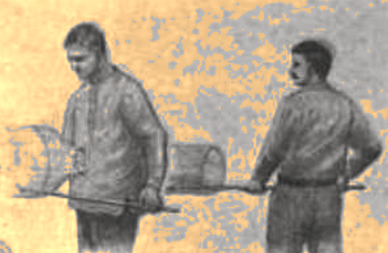
Cutter removing ends of cylinder and slicing the tube lengthwise

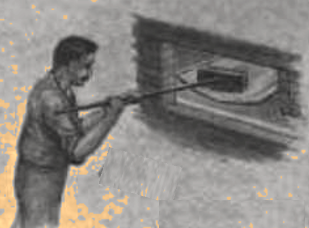
Sliced tube of glass is flattened in an oven

Cylinder blown sheet is a type of hand-blown window glass in which glass is blown into a cylinder shape which is then cut lengthwise and opened flat.

== History ==
Cylinder blown glass was first developed in the second or third century by Roman glass-makers. The quality improved over time until the late antiquity when the glass produced in this way was at least partially transparent. This method was used into the mid 19th century although the quality improved in the later centuries until it was often a transparent window medium. It was superseded eventually by plate glass, which could be produced at good quality faster and more cheaply than blown glass.

== Manufacture ==
Cylinder blown sheet glass is similar to broad sheet glass, but with the creation of larger cylinders to cut and form. Glass is blown into a cylindrical shape by a glass blower. The ends of the cylinder are cut off and a cut is made down one side of the cylinder. The cut cylinder is then placed in an oven where the cylinder unrolls into a flat glass sheet.

Blenko Glass Company used this method to make flat glass during the 20th century, but it used a process patented by William Blenko that used molds for the cylinder to enable consistency in the size of the glass. In Blenko's case, slight imperfections were desired for the purpose of giving the flat glass the appearance of antique glass.

The standard (non-Blenko) cylinder method caused surface damages on the glass due to the flattening and moving, and the sheet therefore had to be ground and polished. In 1839 the Chance Brothers invented the patent plate process where the glass plate was placed on a wet piece of leather and ground and polished to remove all the surface damage.

Other methods of producing hand-blown window glass included broad sheet, blown plate, crown glass and polished plate. These methods of manufacture lasted at least until the end of the 19th century. The early 20th century marks the move away from hand-blown to machine manufactured glass such as rolled plate, machine drawn cylinder sheet, the Fourcault process of flat drawn sheet, single and twin ground polished plate and most common, float glass.

Cylinder blown sheet glass was manufactured in the UK in the mid 19th century. It had been manufactured in France and Germany (and imported to the UK) since the 18th century.
