= Pontil mark =

Scar left on blown glass

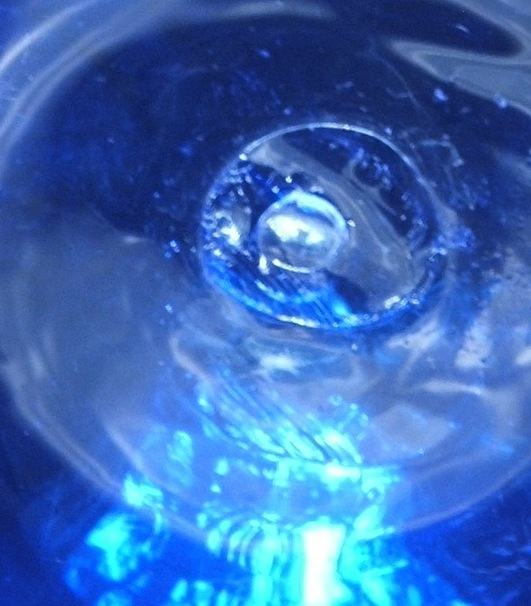
Pontil scar on the base of a free-blown glass bowl

A pontil mark or punt mark is the scar where the pontil, punty or punt was broken from a work of blown glass. The presence of such a scar indicates that a glass bottle or bowl was blown freehand, while the absence of a punt mark suggests either that the mark has been obliterated or that the work was mold-blown.

Note: not all glass with a pontil scar was blown. Some non-blown, free-form glass items were attached to a pontil rod in order to do finishing work on the item; such as crimping the rims, swinging the item upside down to form a swung vase etc., applying glass decorative elements, (rigaree) fire polishing the rims or re-striking, (re-heating) the items made of heat sensitive glass that changes color on the area that has been reheated.

Some glassblowers grind a hollow into the base of their work, obliterating the natural punt scar. Where the base of the work is sufficiently heavy, the entire natural base can be sawed or ground flat. Where the base of the work is concave, after the punt has been broken from the work, the punt may be used to attach a small gather of hot glass over the punt scar, into which a maker's mark is impressed.

As commonly used in the collectibles and antiques industry, the term refers to the mark impressed on a blown glass item over this scar, since many notable glassblowers have impressed or engraved makers marks in the punt scars of their work. In the case of mold-blown work, where no pontil is used during manufacture, the term has also come to apply to marks impressed in the base of the work where the pontil scar would have been had it been free blown.

The base of a wine bottle, particularly when it is indented, has come to be known as a punt, although wine bottles have generally been mold-blown for centuries.

In older enamelled glass there are often two pontil marks, indicating that the piece has been in the furnace twice, before and after the enamels were added.
