= Broad sheet glass =

Hand-blown glass

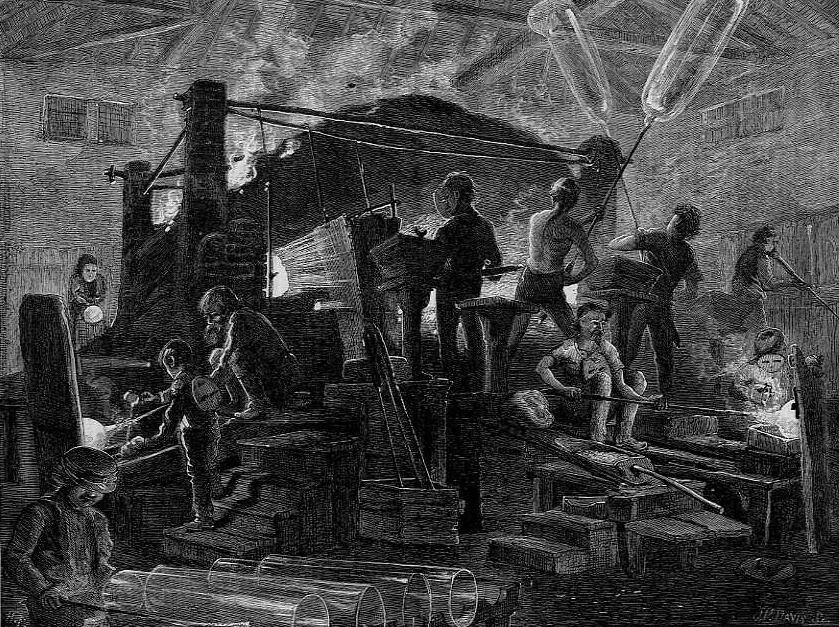
Among the Glass-Workers, an 1871 engraving by Harry Fenn

Broad sheet glass is a type of blown glass that was used for windows prior to the development of plate glass.

== Production ==
Broad sheet glass is made by blowing molten glass into an elongated tube shape with a blowpipe. Then, while the glass is still hot, the ends are cut off and the resulting cylinder is split with shears and flattened on an iron plate. The quality of broad sheet glass was poor, with many imperfections and mostly translucent. Due to the small size of the resulting piece of glass, broad sheet was typically used in leaded windows which are made up of multiple small pieces of glass joined with lead. The center of the window piece was commonly used for decoration in places where looking through the glass wasn't vital. If the piece was large, it was possible to see bubble tracks and strain lines.

Broad sheet and other methods for making hand-blown glass for windows lasted until the 19th century when plate glass became the common form of window glass.

French glass-makers and others were making broad sheet glass earlier than in the UK, notably William Le Verrier, Schurterrers and John Alemayne.

Broad sheet glass was first made in the UK in Chiddingfold, Surrey on the border with Sussex in 1226. The choice of this location may have been due to the availability of suitable sand and the abundance of bracken, the ash of which can be used to make potash (specifically sodium carbonate) for soda-lime glass. The nearby significant beech forests provided charcoal as fuel for the kiln. Examples of glass from this area can be found in Guildford Museum. In 1240 an order was placed for this glass to be used in Westminster Abbey. Between 1350 and 1356 Alemayne secured orders for glass to be used in St. Stephens Chapel, Westminster and St Georges Chapel, Windsor.

Broad sheet glass was of poor quality, and although it let in light it was not transparent. Manufacture slowly decreased and ceased by the early 16th century.

== See also ==
- Crown glass (window)
- blown plate
- polished plate
- cylinder blown sheet
