= Float glass =

Material; type of glass

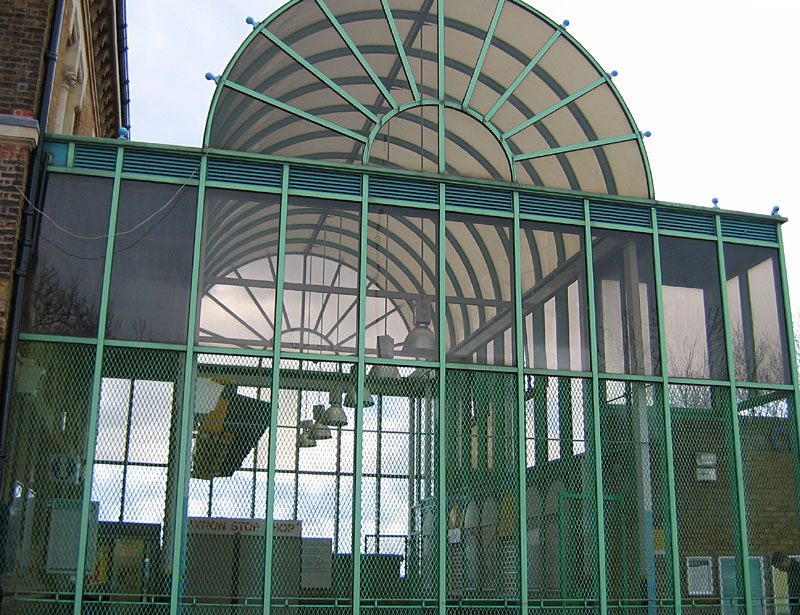
Use of float glass at Crystal Palace railway station, London

Float glass is a sheet of glass made by floating molten glass on a bed of molten metal of a low melting point, typically tin, although lead was used for the process in the past. This method gives the sheet uniform thickness and a very flat surface. The float glass process is also known as the Pilkington process, named after the British glass manufacturer Pilkington, which pioneered the technique in the 1950s at their production site in St Helens, Merseyside.

Modern windows are usually made from float glass, though Corning Incorporated uses the overflow downdraw method.

Most float glass is soda–lime glass, although relatively minor quantities of specialty borosilicate and flat panel display glass are also produced using the float glass process.

== History ==
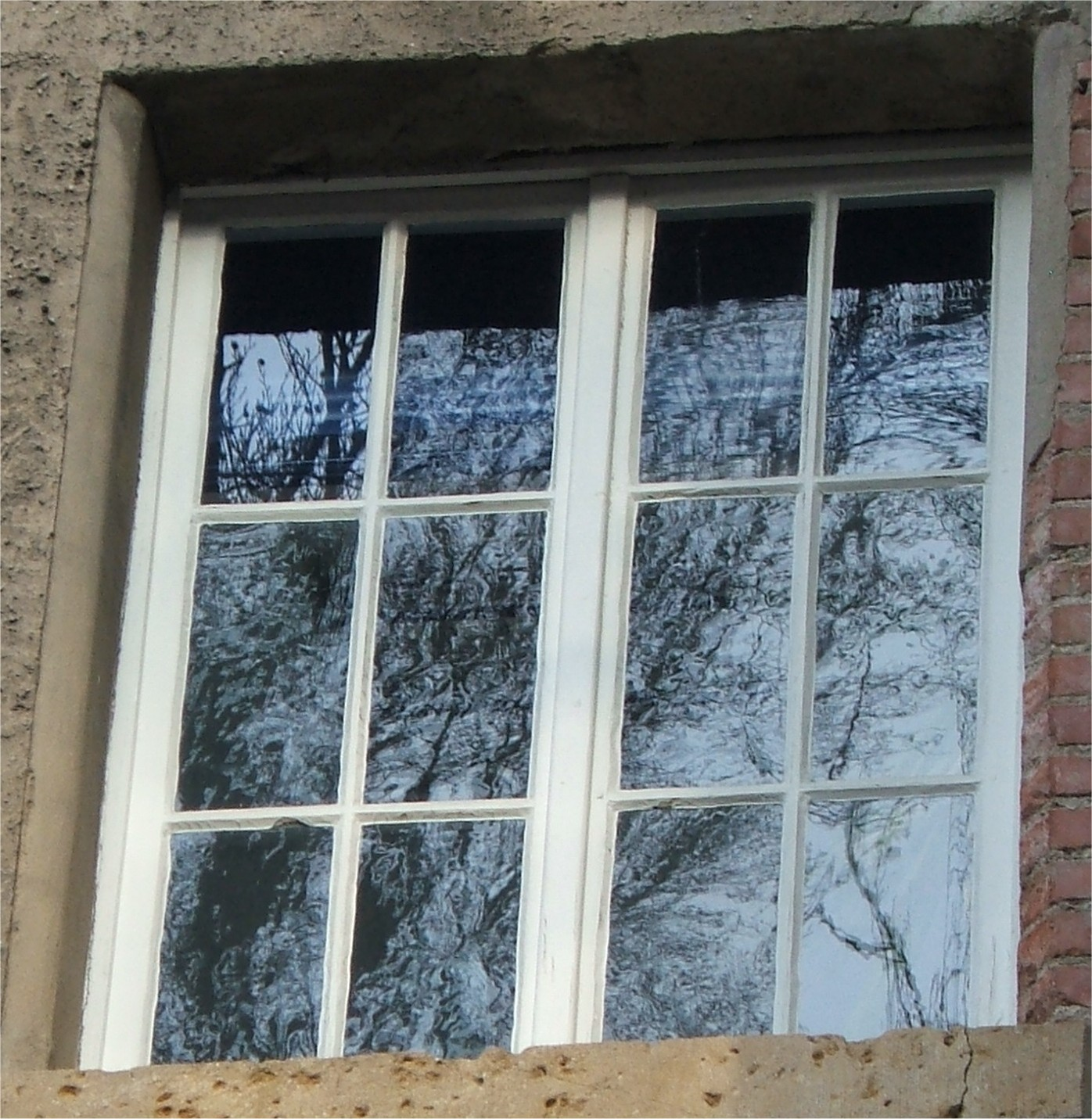
Old window containing a single sheet of float glass in the upper left section, Jena, Germany. The remaining sections are possibly not float glass as indicated by the distorted reflections of a tree.

Until the 16th century, window glass or other flat glass was generally cut from large discs (or rondels) of crown glass. Larger sheets of glass were made by blowing large cylinders which were cut open and flattened, then cut into panes. Most window glass in the early 19th century was made using the cylinder method. The 'cylinders' were 6 to 8 feet (180 to 240 cm) long and 10 to 14 inches (25 to 36 cm) in diameter, limiting the width that panes of glass could be cut, and resulting in windows divided by transoms into rectangular panels.

The first advances in automating glass manufacturing were patented in 1848 by Henry Bessemer. His system produced a continuous ribbon of flat glass by forming the ribbon between rollers. This was an expensive process, as the surfaces of the glass needed polishing. If the glass could be set on a perfectly smooth, flat body, like the surface of an open pan of calm liquid, this would reduce costs considerably. Attempts were made, including by Bessemer, to form flat glass on a bath of molten tin—one of the few liquids denser than glass that would be calm at the high temperatures needed to make glass—most notably in the US. Several patents were granted, but this process was unworkable at the time.

Before the development of float glass, larger sheets of plate glass were made by casting a large puddle of glass on an iron surface, and then polishing both sides, a costly process. From the early 1920s, a continuous ribbon of plate glass was passed through a lengthy series of inline grinders and polishers, reducing glass losses and cost.

Glass of lower quality, drawn glass or broad sheet glass, was made by drawing upwards from a pool of molten glass a thin sheet, held at the edges by rollers. As it cooled the rising sheet stiffened and could then be cut. The two surfaces were of lower quality i.e. not as smooth or uniform as those of float glass. This process continued in use for many years after the development of float glass.

Between 1953 and 1957, at the Cowley Hill Works St Helens, Lancashire, Sir Alastair Pilkington and Kenneth Bickerstaff of the UK's Pilkington Brothers developed the first successful commercial application for forming a continuous ribbon of glass using a molten tin bath on which the molten glass flows unhindered under the influence of gravity. The success of this process lay in the careful balance of the volume of glass fed onto the bath, where it was flattened by its own weight. Full scale profitable sales of float glass were first achieved in 1960, and in the 1960s the process was licensed throughout the world, replacing previous production methods.

== Manufacture ==
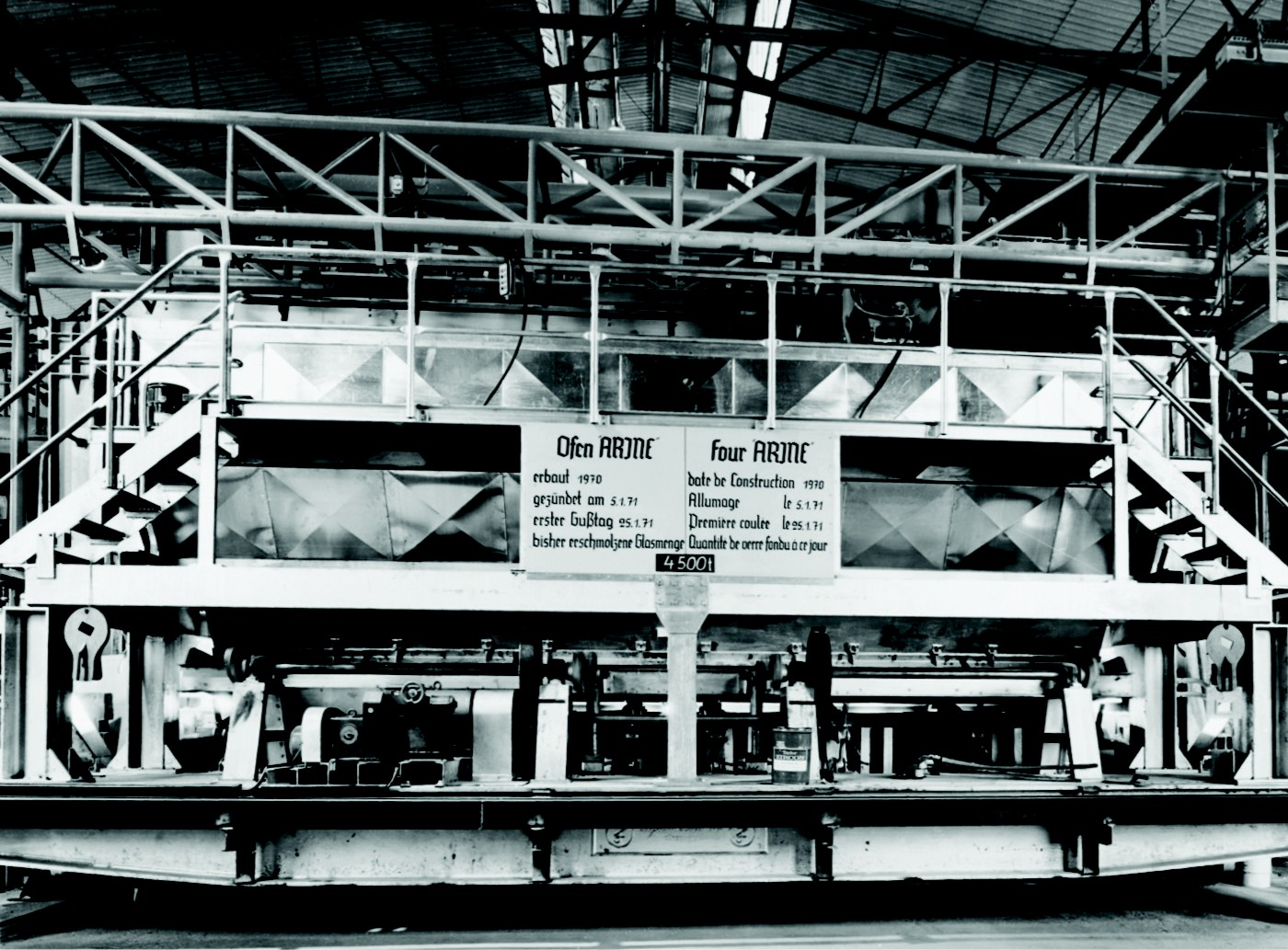
Float glass line

Float glass uses common glass-making raw materials, typically consisting of sand, soda ash (sodium carbonate), dolomite, limestone, and salt cake (sodium sulfate) etc. Other materials may be used as colourants, refining agents or to adjust the physical and chemical properties of the glass. The raw materials are mixed in a batch process, then fed together with a controlled proportion of cullet (waste glass) into a furnace, where it is heated to approximately 1,500 °C. Common float glass furnaces are 9 m wide and 45 m long and have capacities of more than 1,200 tons of glass. Once molten, the temperature of the glass is stabilised to approximately 1,200 °C to ensure a homogeneous density.

The molten glass is fed into a "tin bath", a bath of molten tin (about 3–4 m wide, 50 m long, 6 cm deep), from a delivery canal and is poured into the tin bath by a ceramic lip known as the spout lip. The amount of glass allowed to pour onto the molten tin is controlled by a gate called a tweel.

Molten tin is suitable for the float glass process because it has a higher density than glass, so the molten glass floats on it. Its boiling point is higher than the melting point of glass, and its vapour pressure at process temperature is low. However, tin oxidises in a natural atmosphere to form tin dioxide (SnO_{2}). Known in the production process as dross, the tin dioxide adheres to the glass. To prevent oxidation, the tin bath is provided with a positive pressure protective atmosphere of nitrogen and hydrogen.

The glass flows onto the tin surface forming a floating ribbon of even thickness with perfectly smooth surfaces on both sides. As the glass flows along the tin bath, the temperature is gradually reduced from 1,100 °C until at approximately 600 °C the sheet can be lifted from the tin onto rollers. The glass ribbon is pulled off the bath by rollers at a controlled speed. Variation in the flow speed and roller speed enables glass sheets of varying thickness to be formed. Top rollers positioned above the molten tin may be used to control both the thickness and the width of the glass ribbon.

Once off the bath, the glass sheet passes through a lehr kiln for approximately 100 m, where it is cooled gradually so that it anneals without strain and does not crack from the temperature change. On exiting the "cold end" of the kiln, the glass is cut by machines.

== Uses ==
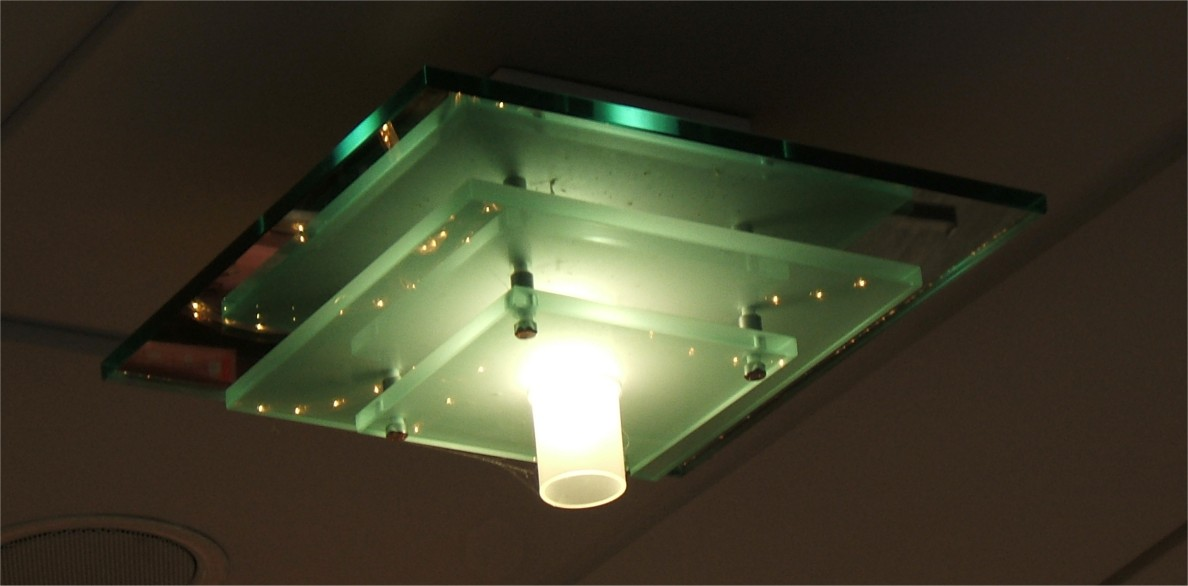
A float glass light fitting. Ordinary float glass is green in thicker sheets due to ferrous impurities.

Today, float glass is the most widely produced form of glass, with a multitude of commercial applications. Due to both its high quality with no additional polishing required and its structural flexibility during production, it can easily be shaped and bent into a variety of forms while in a heated, syrupy state. This makes it ideal for a variety of applications such as

- Automobile glass (e.g. windshields, windows, mirrors)
- Mirrors
- Furniture (e.g. in tables and shelves)
- Insulated glass
- Windows and doors

Most forms of specialized glass such as toughened glass, frosted glass, laminated safety glass and soundproof glass consist of standard float glass that has been further processed.

== See also ==
- Soda–lime glass, including composition and some properties of float glass
- Glass production
- Glass batch calculation
