= Rolled plate glass =

Type of industrially produced glass

Rolled plate is a type of industrially produced glass. It was invented and patented by James Hartley circa 1847. Rolled-plate glass is used architecturally; in the mid-19th century, uses included roofing railway stations and greenhouses.
