= Glassmaking at Blenko Glass Company =

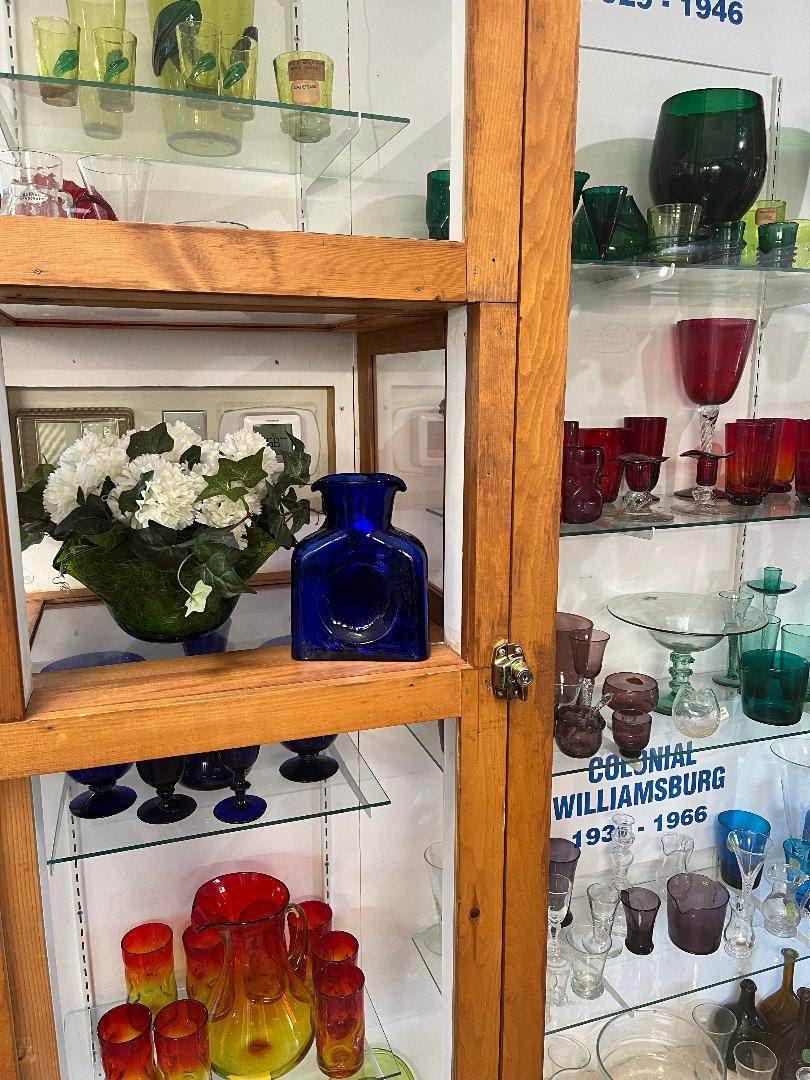
Blenko glassware on display at the Blenko Visitor Center

Blenko Glass Company began producing flat glass in 1922, but did not produce glassware until 1930. The company was founded by William John Blenko, who learned glassmaking in England. Blenko was a chemist who could produce hundreds of colors of glass, and he used his skills to produce antique flat glass that was used to make stained glass windows. During the 1920s, his glass company was named Eureka Art Glass Company, and it manufactured flat glass in Milton, West Virginia.

In late 1929, the United States began an economic depression that became known as the Great Depression. The company experienced a sharp drop in demand for antique flat glass, but survived by adding glassware to its product portfolio. In 1930, the Eureka Art Glass Company changed its name to Blenko Glass Company. During the 1940s, the company began a practice of hiring glass designers who helped the company establish a reputation for contemporary art glass. By 1995, 70 percent of the company's business was glassware such as bottles, vases, and lamps. The remaining 30 percent was the original antique flat glass.

The company's contemporary focus is collectible glassware. Glassmaking still involves methods common in the late 19th century. The glass is hand blown by a human glassblower instead of the glassblowing machine invented in the early 20th century. In some cases, the product is reheated in another furnace for additional shaping. A finisher finalizes the product, which can include cutting the glass. The final product is gradually cooled on a conveyor that is hot on the starting point and room-temperature at the end. Products are manually inspected before they are made ready for sale.

== Background ==
=== Beginning ===
The founder of Blenko Glass Company, William John Blenko (1854–1933), learned glassmaking at a bottle works in England. He began working at the plant at the age of 10. Educated as a chemist, he learned to make antique sheet glass that had the look of stained glass windows from Medieval times. Eventually he was exporting antique flat glass to the United States. Blenko had the ability to produce various colors of glass, and his glass was used in stained glass windows. He came to the United States in 1893 to start a glass works in Indiana. The Indiana works failed after about 10 years, and Blenko had two more failures in Pennsylvania and West Virginia. His fourth try began producing in 1922, and he named this firm Eureka Art Glass Company. This company is located in Milton, West Virginia.

=== Glassware production begins ===
In late 1929, the Great Depression began in the United States, and few stained glass studios could afford to buy stained glass while construction of new buildings was almost nonexistent. Eureka Art Glass survived by adding glassware to its line of products, which was a change advocated by Blenko's son William Henry Blenko (1897–1969). The company hired two Swedish-American glassmakers to train its workforce to make glassware, and its products were originally sold by a firm known for importing Italian luxury goods. In August 1930, the company changed its name from Eureka Art Glass to Blenko Glass Company. The Italian goods importer, Carbone and Sons, sold Blenko glassware under the name of "Kenova" glass, which it said was manufactured in West Virginia by foreign craftsmen. Blenko also sold glassware directly from its factory, and continued to produce glass for stained glass windows. By the mid-1930s, Blenko glassware was for sale in department stores such as Macy's, Lazarus, and Neiman Marcus.

In 1947, the company hired Winslow Anderson as a full-time designer. This began its use of glassware designers, which enabled it to gain a reputation as a leader in contemporary glassware. During the 1950s, the company employed over 100 people, produced about 280 types of glassware, produced flat glass, and could make about 1,000 different tints. By 1995, Blenko's business was 70 percent glassware and 30 percent flat glass. Its glassware was sold through Sharper Image and department stores such as Bloomingdale's and Nordstrom. In the 21st century, the company survived the difficult periods of the Great Recession and COVID-19 pandemic. By this time the company focused on a different method for selling its glassware. Instead of relying on department stores and small gift shops, internet sales and merchandisers that sold via the internet became the most important way to sell products. In 2024, the company still produced glassware at its West Virginia glass works, and it still used 19th century production methods.

== Glassmaking ==
Glass is made by starting with a batch of ingredients, melting it, forming the glass product, and gradually cooling it. The batch of ingredients is dominated by sand, which contains silica. Other ingredients such as soda ash, potash, lime, and recycled glass (cullet) are added. Additional ingredients may be added to color the glass. For example, an oxide of cobalt is used to make glass blue. The batch is placed inside a pot or tank that is heated by a furnace. A 2004 description of the Blenko melting process said the batch is heated to about 2600 °F (1427 °C), and cooked for about 24 hours. Then the mixture is cooled to between 2000 °F (1093 °C) and 2300 °F (1260 °C), making it ready to be blown and shaped. Final glass products must be cooled gradually (annealed), or they will break. A conveyor oven called a lehr, hot at the beginning of the conveyor and room-temperature at the end, is used for annealing.

=== Glassware production ===
Glassware making at Blenko Glass Company is done using centuries-old processes, with all products handmade. During the 1950s, there were typically ten glassware production teams consisting of six or seven people led by the glassblower. Glassware production begins with a gatherer collecting a "gob" of molten glass from a furnace using a blowpipe. The blowpipe is given to a glassblower who blows into the pipe to shape the glass. The shaping is assisted by the use of tools, and some glass is blown into a mold. In some cases, separate gobs of glass (such as handles) may be added to the main piece. The glass can be reheated in a small furnace called a "glory hole" that makes it easier to modify the glass. Final shaping is done by a finisher who may cut off pieces of glass. The final product is annealed on the lehr. After the glass has cooled on the lehr, the product is inspected, packaged, and shipped.

Blenko glassware production process in 2024 - part 1
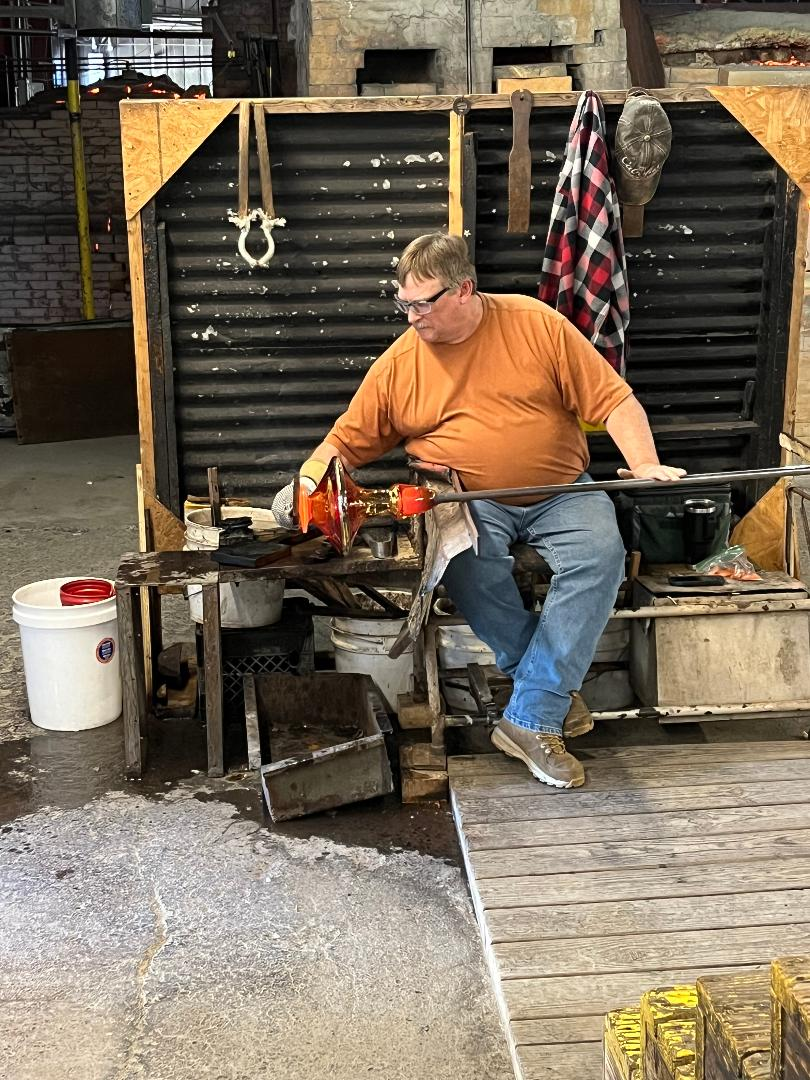
Glassblower shapes orange-hot glass

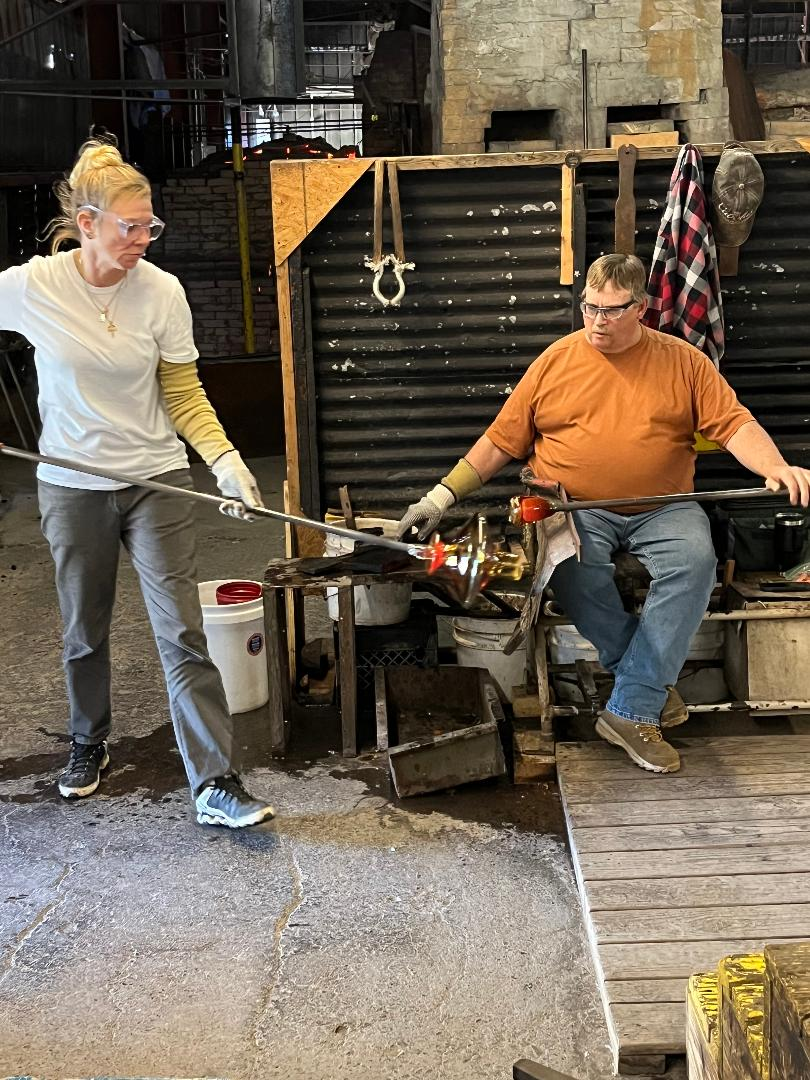
Glassware is detached from blow pipe for more shaping

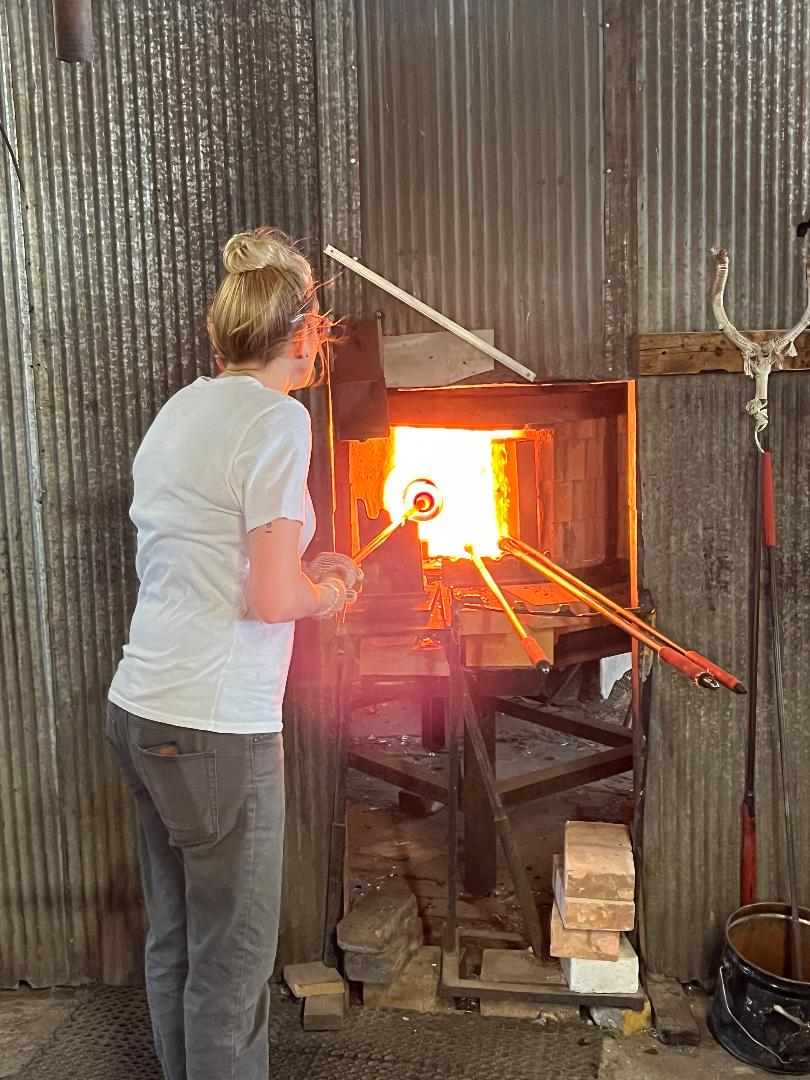
Glassware is reheated in oven for more work

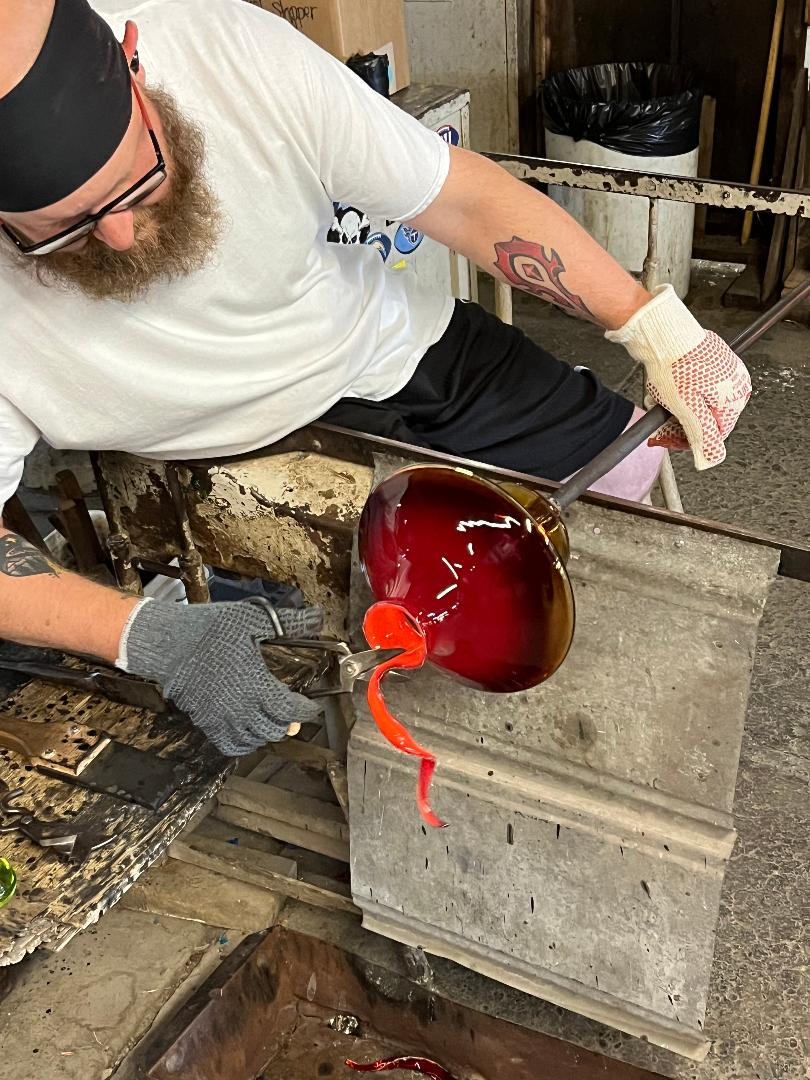
Reheated glassware with additional shaping is trimmed
Blenko glassware production process in 2024 - part 2
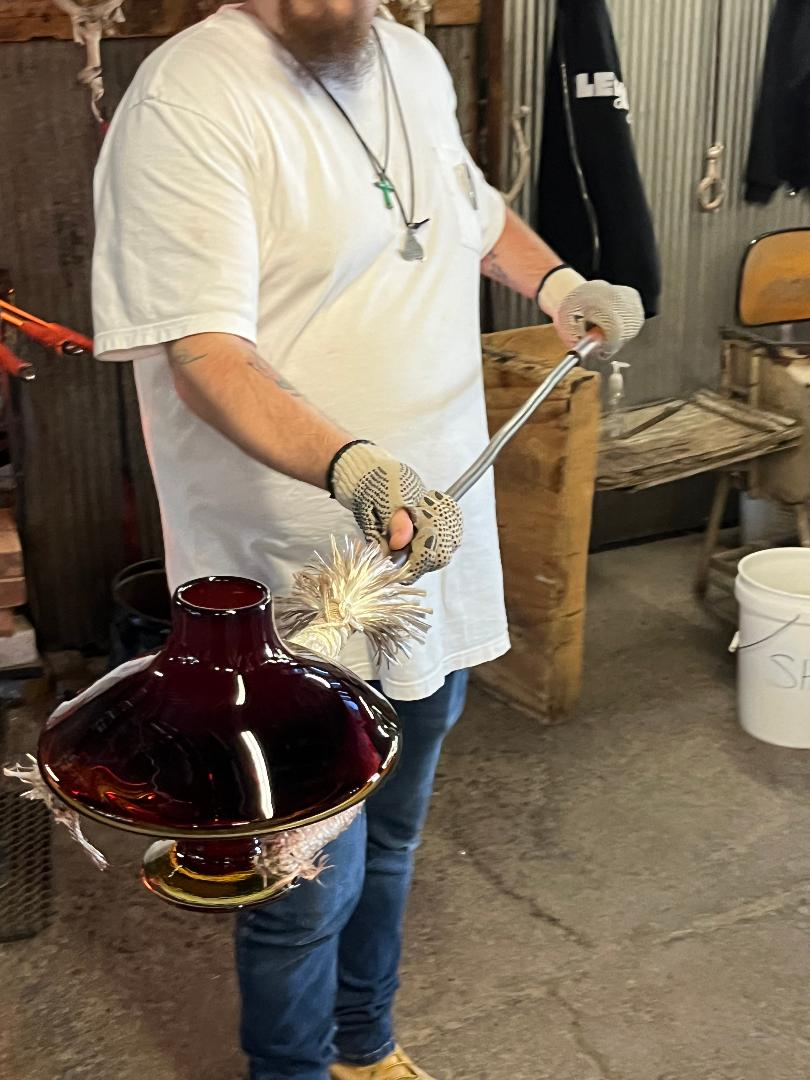
Finished glassware product is ready for lehr

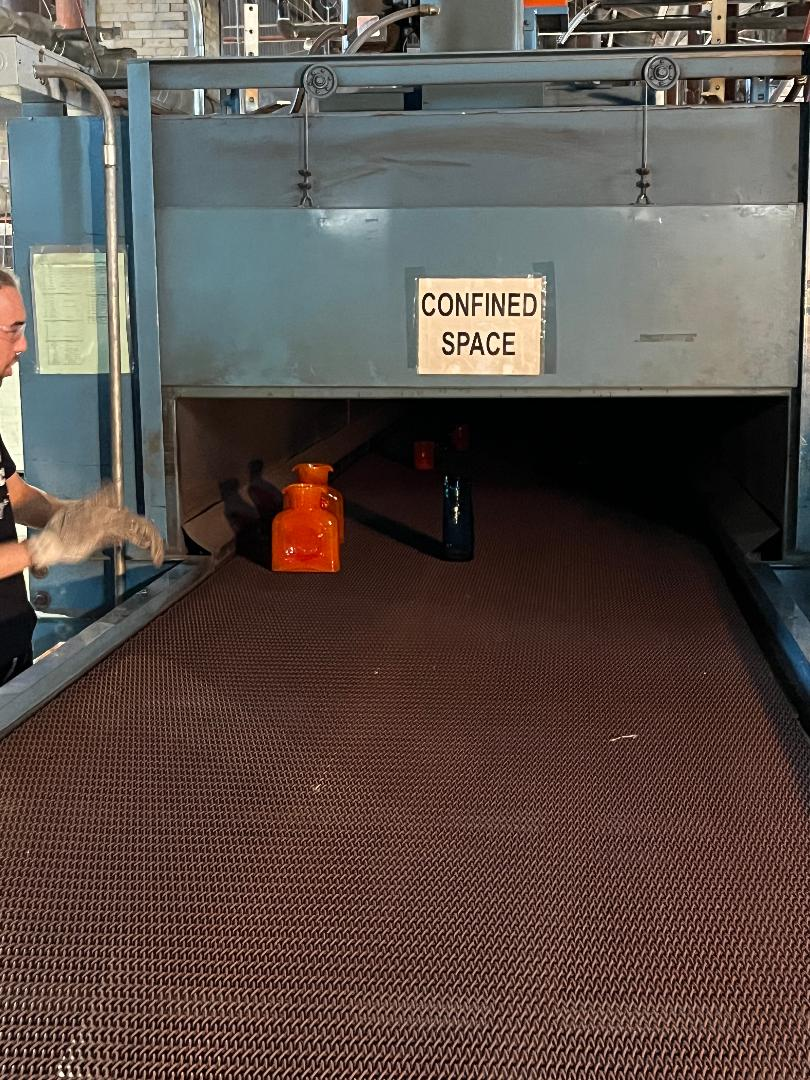
Bottle at cool end of lehr

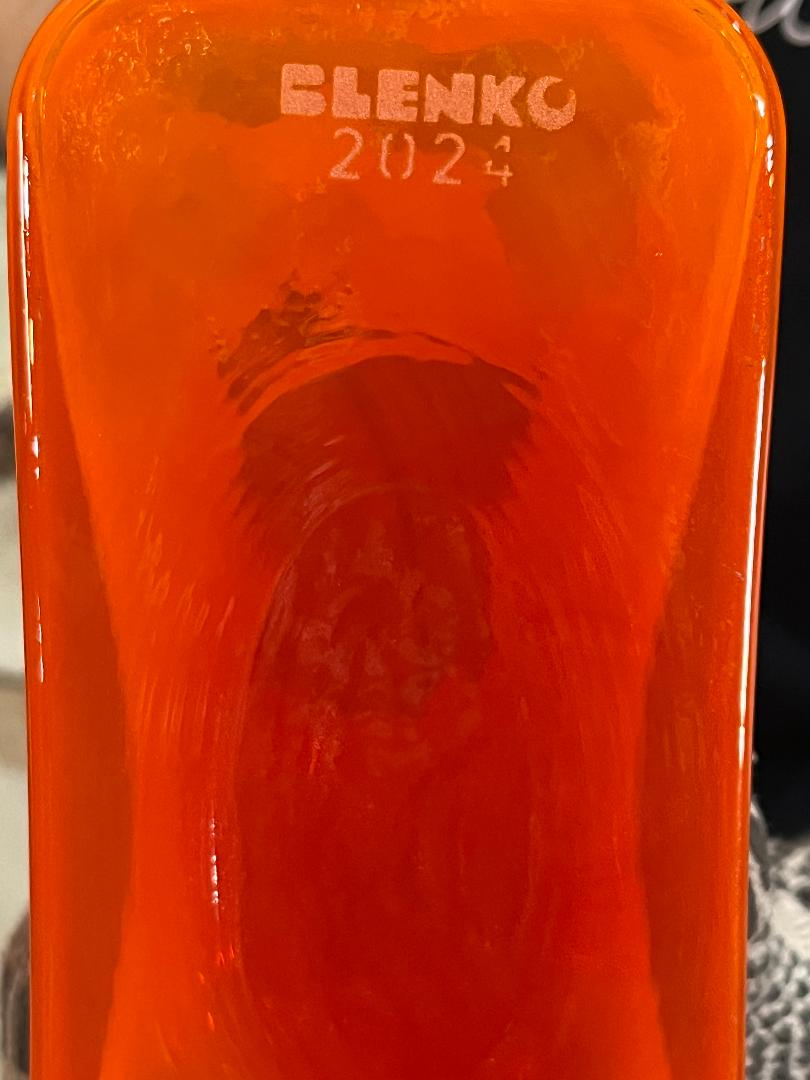
Blenko mark added to bottle after inspection

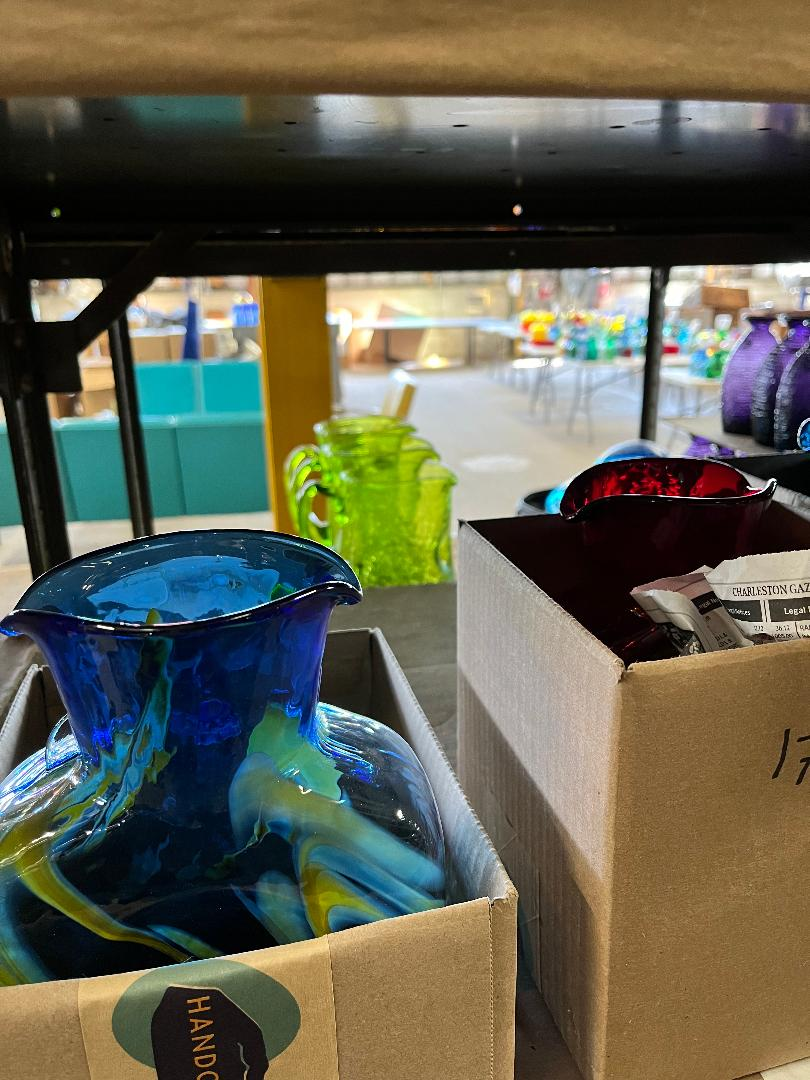
Blenko glassware products being prepared for shipping

=== Flat glass production ===
Flat glass making at Blenko utilized the hand–blown cylinder glass method that was common in the 1880s. During the first quarter of the 20th century, many other flat glass makers replaced well-paid human glassblowers with the Lubbers glassblowing machine. A few years later, the entire process was changed and became more automated. (Note: Glassblowers and gatherers used in the window glassmaking process were made obsolete during the early 1900s by a glass blowing machine designed by John H. Lubbers. During the 1920s, flat glass making changed dramatically because of inventions that changed the entire process such as the Colburn process pioneered by Irving Wightman Colburn and Michael Owens, Pittsburgh Plate Glass' 1926 sheet glass machine, and a European method known as the Fourcault process.) Blenko did not update its method for making flat glass. Its process remained similar to its glassware methodology, but less shaping was needed. After the gatherer retrieved a gob of glass, the glassblower blew a hollow cylinder into a mold. The cylinder was annealed and then cut on both ends. A cut was then made lengthwise on the cylinder and it was placed in a reheating furnace where the cylinder opens and flattens. The glass was then annealed once again.

Blowing the cylinder into a mold is not a normal part of the cylinder method. William J. Blenko received a patent on his process of using an unpolished mold to make the flat glass uniform in size and giving it an appearance that suggests it is old. The patent was called "Art Glass and Method of Making the Same". He filed for the patent on February 26, 1924, and it was granted on May 4, 1926. In the illustration accompanying Blenko's patent, one can see a drawing of the inside of a mold in Figure 1. A gob of molten glass attached to a blowpipe is inserted into the mold in Figure 2. The glassblower blows the gob of glass into cylinder inside the mold, and the mold with the glass cylinder inside can be seen in Figure 3. In Figure 4, the ends of the cylinder have been cut off, and the remains of the cylinder was sliced lengthwise. Figure 5 shows the flat glass after it had been flattened and annealed. Each sheet is uniform in size.

Blenko flat glass production process
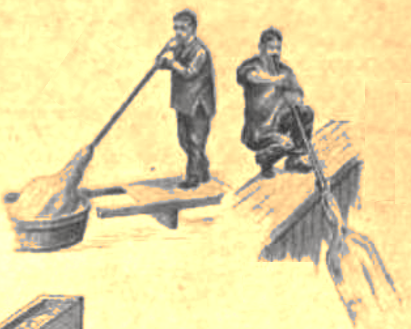
Cylinder method: Glassblowers use blowpipe to blow a cylinder of glass

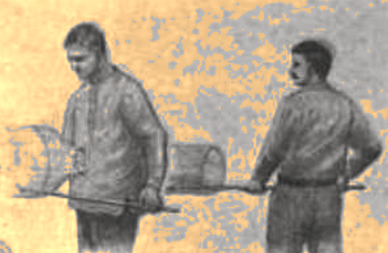
Cylinder method: Ends are cut off cylinder and cylinder is cut lengthwise

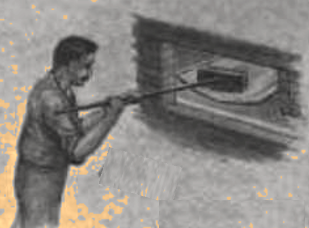
Cylinder method: Cylinder is flattened in oven

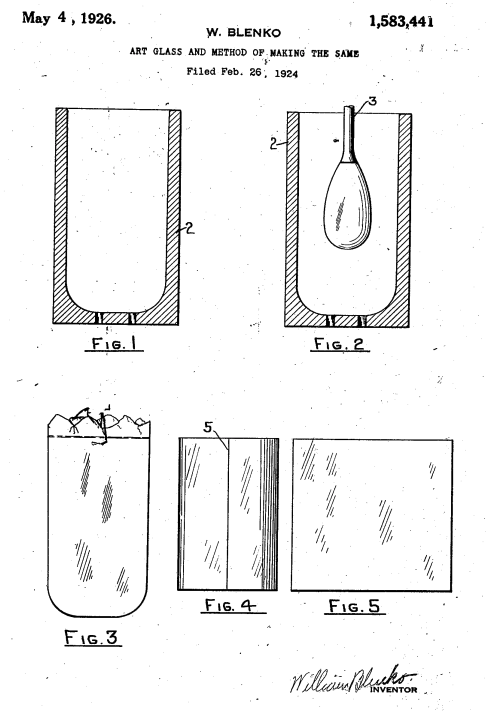
Blenko's patent showing stages of production

== Notes ==
=== References ===
- Casto, James E. (March 2017). "Blenko Changing How Its Colorful Glass is Sold". The State Journal. 33 (11). Charleston, West Virginia: 12. ProQuest 1882368134.
- Chandler, Alfred D.; Hikino, Takashi (1990). Scale and Scope: The Dynamics of Industrial Capitalism. Cambridge, Massachusetts: Belknap Press. ISBN 978-0-67478-994-4. OCLC 20013290.
- Crain, Damon (April 2004). "Blenko – Uniquely American Modernist Glass". Journal of Antiques & Collectibles. V (2). Sturbridge, Massachusetts. Archived from the original on November 12, 2024.
- Crain, Damon (Fall 2007). "Blenko Glass: For Museums and the Masses". Modernism Magazine. 10 (3). Lambertville, New Jersey. Archived from the original on December 2, 2023.
- Fones–Wolf, Ken (Winter 2002). "Immigrants, Labor and Capital in a Transnational Context: Belgian Glass Workers in America, 1880-1925". Journal of American Ethnic History. 21 (2). Champaign, Illinois: University of Illinois Press (JSTOR): 59–80. doi:10.2307/27502813. JSTOR 27502813. S2CID 254481564. Archived from the original on September 26, 2023.
- Jackson, Lesley (2000). 20th Century Factory Glass. New York City: Rizzoli. ISBN 978-0-84782-253-9. OCLC 1369742032.
- Krak, J.B., ed. (January 1922). "News of the Trade". The Glass Industry. 3 (1). New York, New York: Glass Industry Publishing Company: 23–24. OCLC 1751261. Archived from the original on October 7, 2024.
- Skrabec, Quentin R. (2007). Michael Owens and the Glass Industry. Gretna, Louisiana: Pelican Publishing. ISBN 978-1-45560-883-6. OCLC 1356375205.
- Shotwell, David J. (2002). Glass A to Z. Iola, Wisconsin: Krause Publications. ISBN 978-0-87349-385-7. OCLC 440702171.
- Weeks, Joseph D.; United States Census Office (1884). Report on the Manufacture of Glass. Washington, District of Columbia: U.S. Government Printing Office. OCLC 2123984. Archived from the original on July 16, 2023.
