= Architectural glass =

Building material

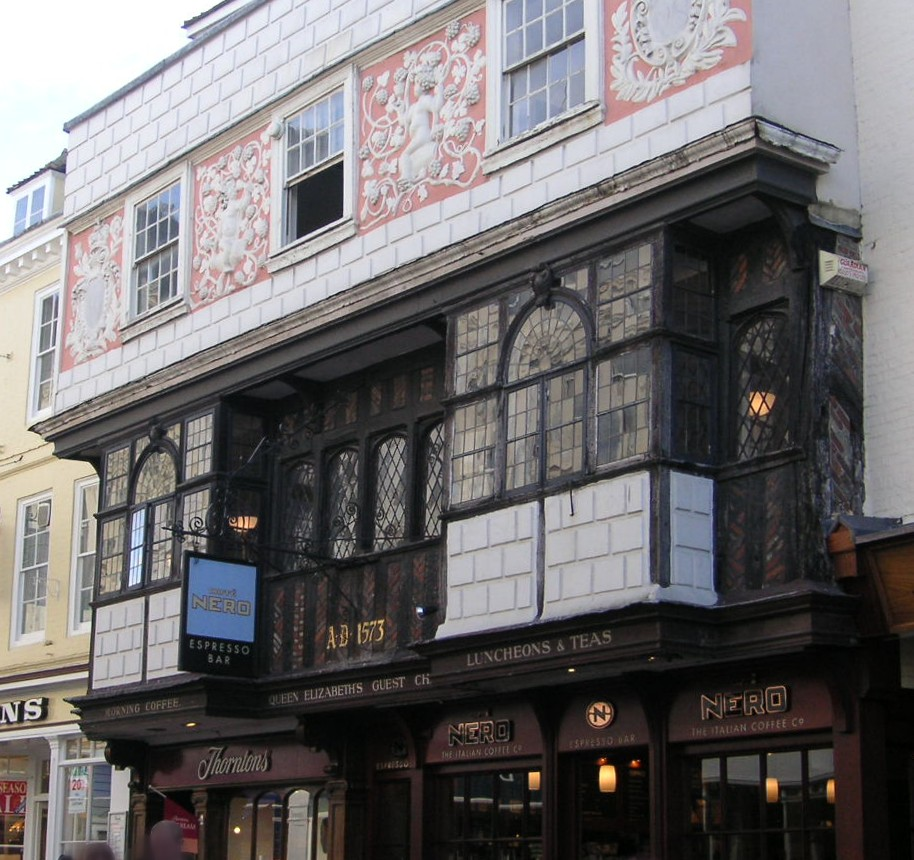
A building in Canterbury, England, which displays its long history in different building styles and glazing of every century from the 16th to the 20th included.

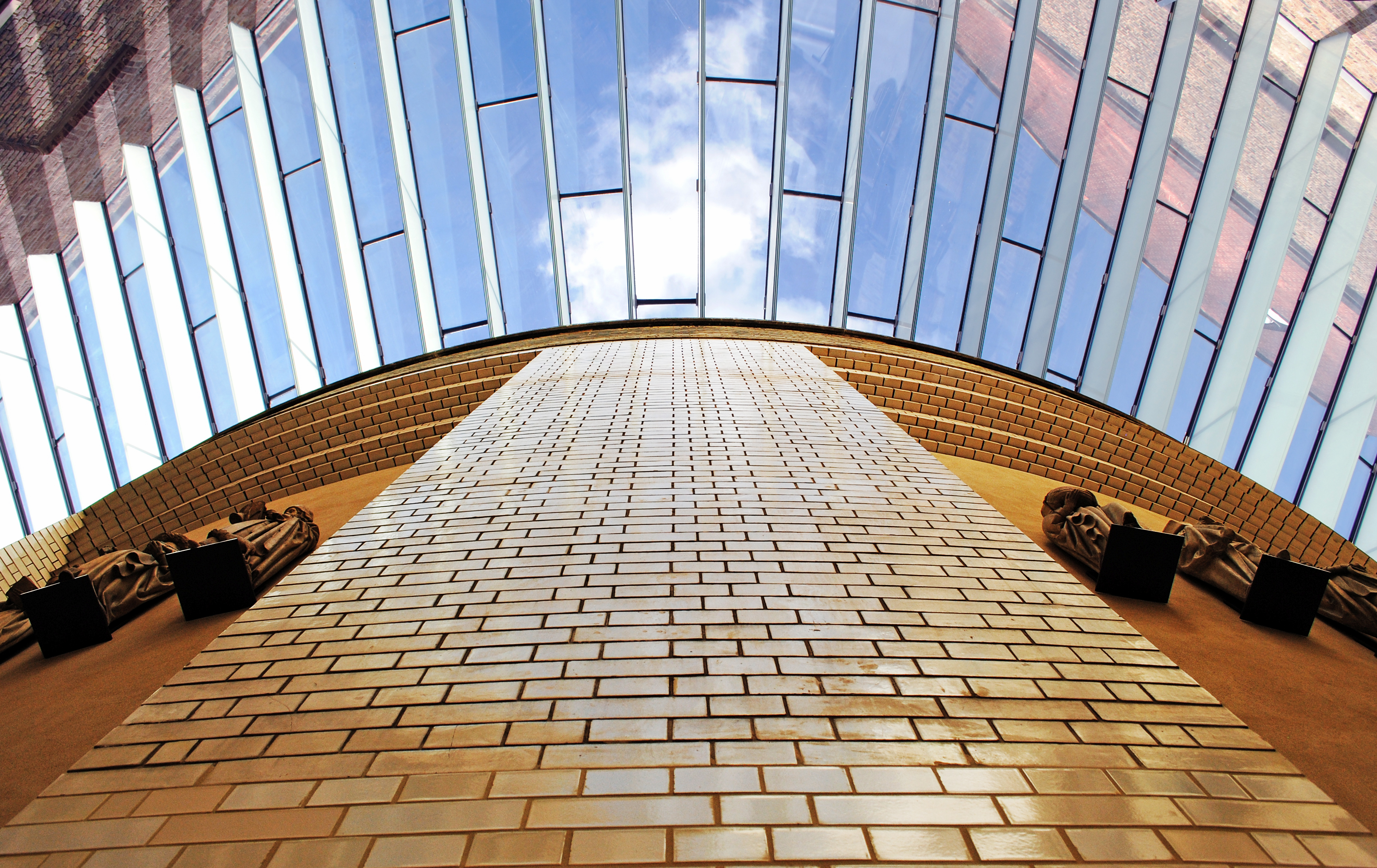
The Daylit Gallery in the Victoria and Albert Museum has an all glass roof

Architectural glass is glass that is used as a building material. It is most typically used as transparent glazing material in the building envelope, including windows in the external walls. Glass is also used for internal partitions and as an architectural feature. When used in buildings, glass is often of a safety type, which include reinforced, toughened and laminated glasses.

== History ==
=== Timeline of modern architectural glass development ===
- 1226: "Broad Sheet" first produced in Sussex.
- 1330: "Crown glass" for art work and vessels first produced in Rouen, France. "Broad Sheet" also produced. Both were also supplied for export.
- 1500s: A method of making mirrors out of plate glass was developed by Venetian glassmakers on the island of Murano, who covered the back of the glass with a mercury-tin amalgam, obtaining near-perfect and undistorted reflection.
- 1620s: "Blown plate" first produced in London. Used for mirrors and coach plates.
- 1678: "Crown glass" first produced in London. This process dominated until the 19th century.
- 1843: An early form of "float glass" invented by Henry Bessemer, pouring glass onto liquid tin. Expensive and not a commercial success.
- 1874: Tempered glass is developed by Francois Barthelemy Alfred Royer de la Bastie (1830–1901) of Paris, France, by quenching almost molten glass in a heated bath of oil or grease.
- 1888: Machine-rolled glass introduced, allowing patterns.
- 1898: Wired-cast glass first commercially produced by Pilkington for use where safety or security was an issue.
- 1959: Float glass launched in UK. Invented by Sir Alastair Pilkington.

== Types ==
=== Cast glass ===
Glass casting is the process in which glass objects are cast by directing molten glass into a mould where it solidifies. The technique has been used since the Egyptian period. Modern cast glass is formed by a variety of processes such as kiln casting, or casting into sand, graphite or metal moulds. Cast glass windows, albeit with poor optical qualities, began to appear in the most important buildings in Rome and the most luxurious villas of Herculaneum and Pompeii.

=== Crown glass ===
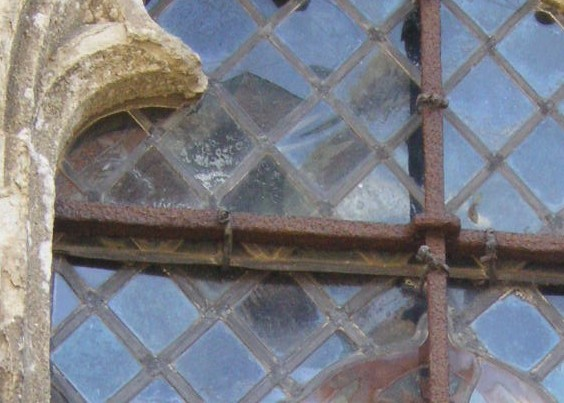
The concentric arcs that distort some of these panes indicate they are crown glass, possibly of the 16th century.

One of the earliest methods of glass window manufacture was the crown glass method. Hot blown glass was cut open opposite the pipe, then rapidly spun on a table before it could cool. Centrifugal force shaped the hot globe of glass into a round, flat sheet. The sheet would then be broken off the pipe and trimmed to form a rectangular window to fit into a frame. At the center of a piece of crown glass, a thick remnant of the original blown bottle neck would remain, hence the name "bullseye". Optical distortions produced by the bullseye could be reduced by grinding the glass. The development of diaper latticed windows was in part because three regular diamond-shaped panes could be conveniently cut from a piece of Crown glass, with minimum waste and with minimum distortion.

=== Cylinder glass ===
In this manufacturing process, glass is blown into a cylindrical iron mould. The ends are cut off and a cut is made down the side of the cylinder. The cut cylinder is then placed in an oven where the cylinder unrolls into a flat glass sheets.

=== Drawn Sheet glass (Fourcault process) ===
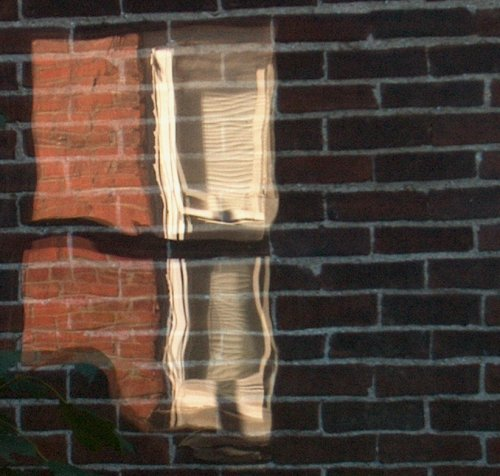
The uneven surface of old glass is visible in the reflection on this window pane.

Drawn Sheet glass was made by dipping a leader into a vat of molten glass then pulling that leader straight up while a film of glass hardened just out of the vat – this is known as the Fourcault process. This film or ribbon was pulled up continuously held by tractors on both edges while it cooled. After 12 metres or so it was cut off the vertical ribbon and tipped down to be further cut. This glass is clear but has thickness variations due to small temperature changes just out of the vat as it was hardening. These variations cause lines of slight distortions. This glass may still be seen in older houses. Float glass replaced this process.

Irving Wightman Colburn developed a similar method independently. He began experimenting with the method in 1899, and started production in 1906. He went bankrupt, but was bought by Michael Joseph Owens. Because the method was imperfect, they kept refining it till 1916 when they felt it was perfect, and opened a glass factory based on the technology the year after.

=== Cast plate glass ===
In 1838, James Hartley was granted a patent for Hartley's Patent Rolled Plate, manufactured by a new cast glass process. The glass is taken from the furnace in large iron ladles, which are carried upon slings running on overhead rails; from the ladle the glass is thrown upon the cast-iron bed of a rolling-table; and is rolled into sheet by an iron roller, the process being similar to that employed in making plate-glass, but on a smaller scale. The sheet thus rolled is roughly trimmed while hot and soft, so as to remove those portions of glass which have been spoiled by immediate contact with the ladle, and the sheet, still soft, is pushed into the open mouth of an annealing tunnel or temperature-controlled oven called a lehr, down which it is carried by a system of rollers.

=== Polished plate glass ===
The polished plate glass process starts with sheet or rolled plate glass. This glass is dimensionally inaccurate and often created visual distortions. These rough panes were ground flat and then polished clear. This was a fairly expensive process.

Before the float process, mirrors were plate glass as sheet glass had visual distortions that were akin to those seen in amusement park or funfair mirrors.

In 1918 the Belgian engineer Emil Bicheroux improved the plate glass manufacturing by pouring molten glass between two rollers, which resulted in more even thickness and fewer undulations, and reduced the need for grinding and polishing. This process was further improved in the US.

=== Rolled plate (figured) glass ===
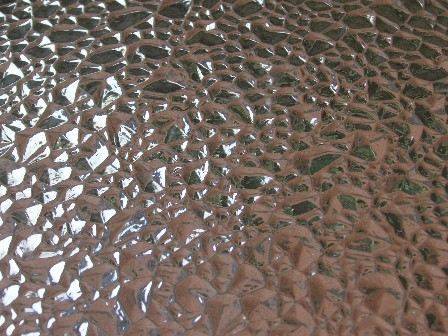
Figure rolled glass

The elaborate patterns found on figured (or 'Cathedral') rolled-plate glass are produced in a similar fashion to the rolled plate glass process except that the plate is cast between two rollers, one of which carries a pattern. On occasion, both rollers can carry a pattern. The pattern is impressed upon the sheet by a printing roller which is brought down upon the glass as it leaves the main rolls while still soft. This glass shows a pattern in high relief. The glass is then annealed in a lehr.

The glass used for this purpose is typically whiter in colour than the clear glasses used for other applications.

Only some of the figured glasses may be toughened, dependent on the depth of the embossed pattern. Single rolled figured glass, where the pattern is only imprinted into one surface, may be laminated to produce a safety glass. The much less common 'double rolled figured glass', where the pattern is embossed into both surfaces, can not be made into a safety glass but will already be thicker than average figured plate to accommodate both patterned faces. The finished thickness being dependent on the imprinted design.

=== Float glass ===
Ninety percent of the world's flat glass is produced by the float glass process invented in the 1950s by Sir Alastair Pilkington of Pilkington Glass, in which molten glass is poured onto one end of a molten tin bath. The glass floats on the tin, and levels out as it spreads along the bath, giving a smooth face to both sides. The glass cools and slowly solidifies as it travels over the molten tin and leaves the tin bath in a continuous ribbon. The glass is then annealed by cooling in an oven called a lehr. The finished product has near-perfect parallel surfaces.

The side of the glass that has been in contact with the tin has a very small amount of the tin embedded in its surface. This quality makes that side of the glass easier to be coated in order to turn it into a mirror, however that side is also softer and easier to scratch.

Glass is produced in standard metric thicknesses of 2, 3, 4, 5, 6, 8, 10, 12, 15, 19 and 25 mm, with 10mm being the most popular sizing in the architectural industry. Molten glass floating on tin in a nitrogen/hydrogen atmosphere will spread out to a thickness of about 6 mm and stop due to surface tension. Thinner glass is made by stretching the glass while it floats on the tin and cools. Similarly, thicker glass is pushed back and not permitted to expand as it cools on the tin.

==== Toughened glass ====
Toughened (or tempered) glass is made from standard Float Glass to create an impact resistant, safety glass. Broken float glass yields sharp, hazardous shards. The toughening process introduces tensions between internal and external surfaces to increase its strength and ensure in the case of breakages the glass shatters into small, harmless pieces of glass. The cut glass panels are put into a toughening furnace. Here the glass panels are heated to upward of 600 degrees C and then the surfaces are cooled rapidly with cold air. This produces tensile stresses on the surface of the glass with the warmer internal glass particles. As the top thickness of the glass cools it contracts and forces the corresponding glass elements to contract to introduce stresses into the glass panel and increasing strength.

=== Prism glass ===
Prism glass is architectural glass which bends light. It was frequently used around the turn of the 20th century to provide natural light to underground spaces and areas far from windows. Prism glass can be found on sidewalks, where it is known as vault lighting, in windows, partitions, and canopies, where it is known as prism tiles, and as deck prisms, which were used to light spaces below deck on sailing ships. It could be highly ornamented; Frank Lloyd Wright created over forty different designs for prism tiles. Modern architectural prism lighting is generally done with a plastic film applied to ordinary window glass.

=== Glass block ===
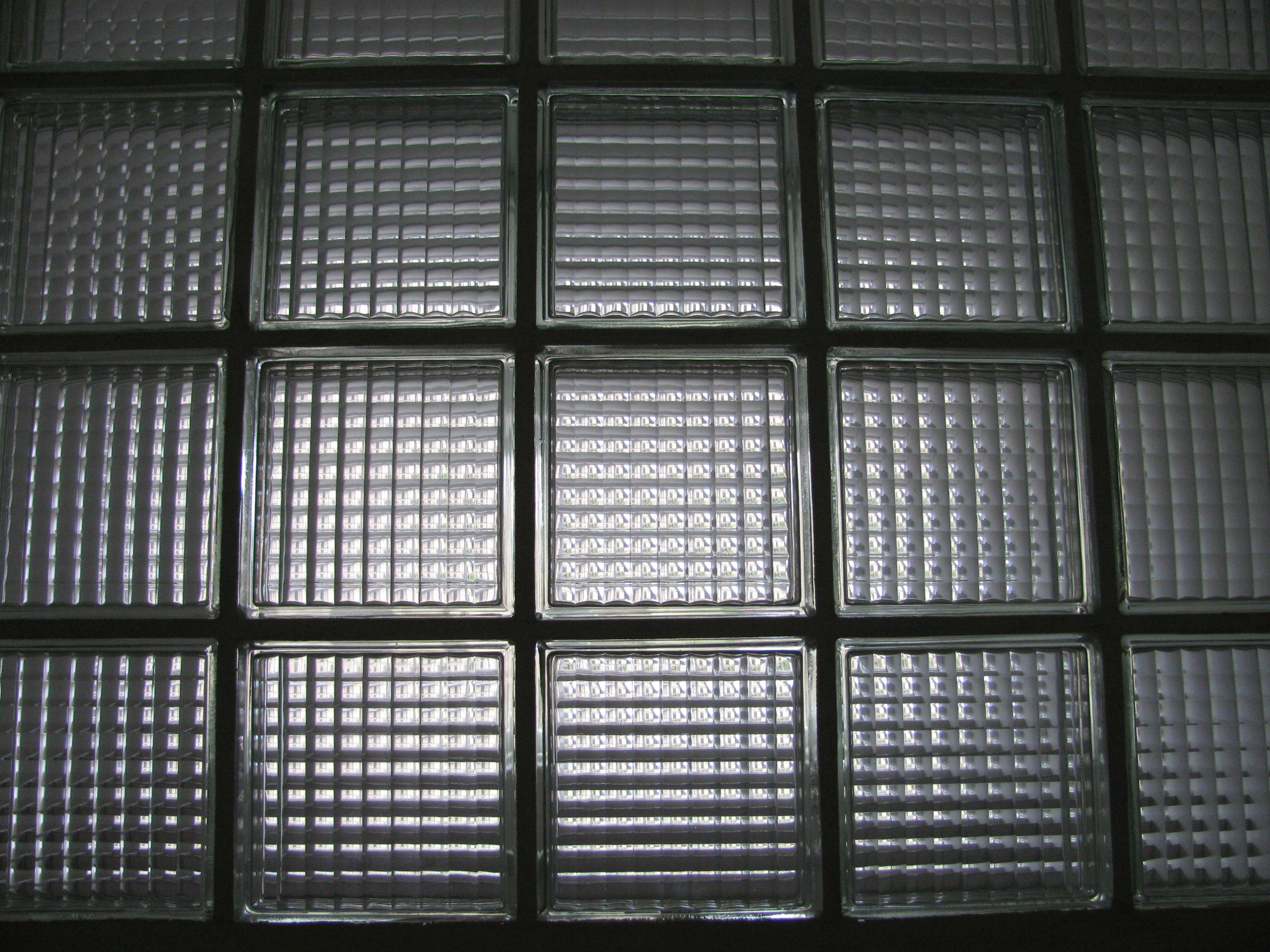
Glass bricks used in a wall

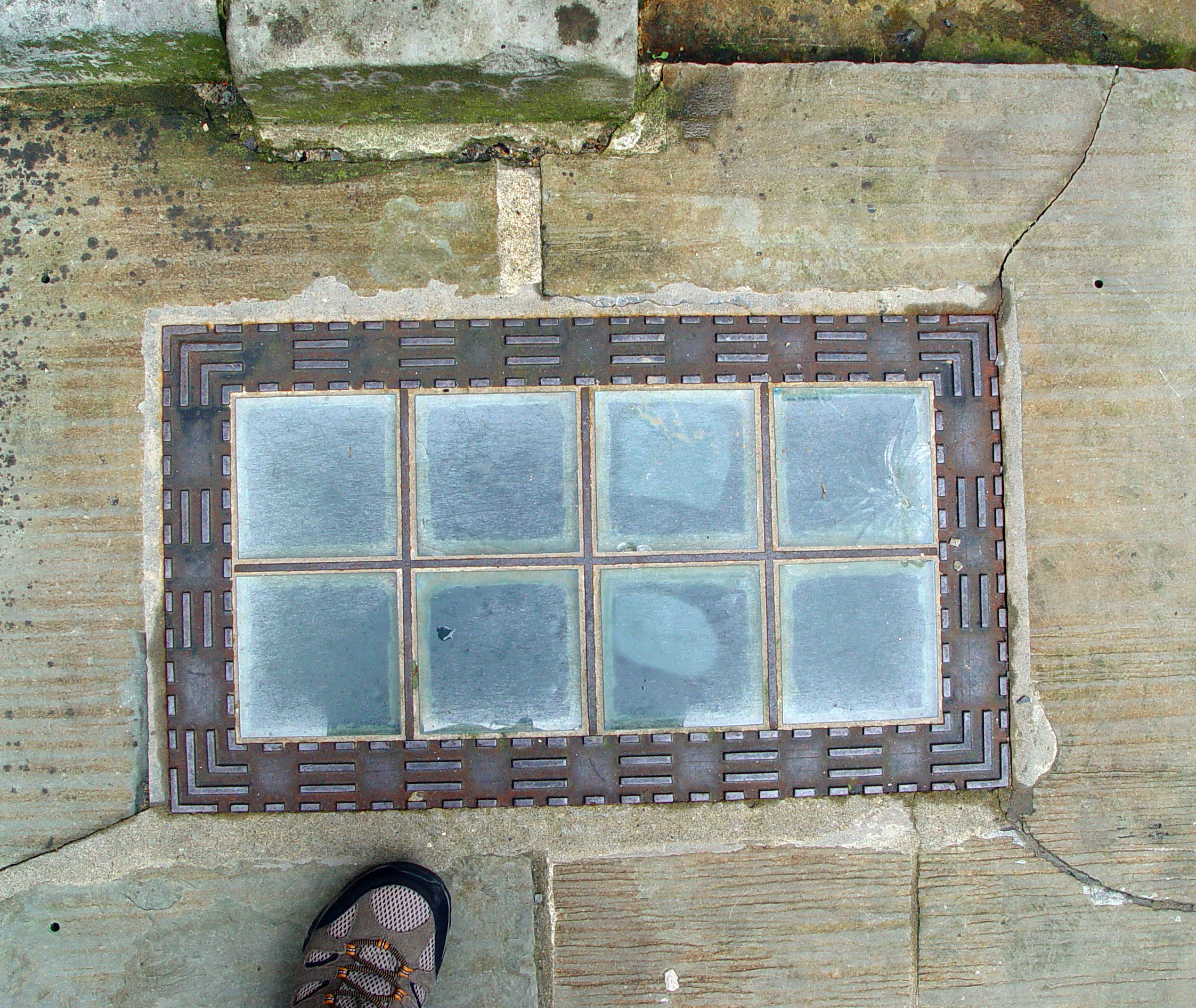
Sidewalk skylight (also named 'pavement light') outside Burlington House, London

Glass block, also known as glass brick, is an architectural element made from glass used in areas where privacy or visual obscuration is desired while admitting light, such as underground parking garages, washrooms, and municipal swimming baths. Glass block was originally developed in the early 1900s to provide natural light in industrial factories.

=== Annealed glass ===
Annealed glass is glass without internal stresses caused by heat treatment, i.e., rapid cooling, or by toughening or heat strengthening. Glass becomes annealed if it is heated above a transition point then allowed to cool slowly, without being quenched. Float glass is annealed during the process of manufacture. However, most toughened glass is made from float glass that has been specially heat-treated.

Annealed glass breaks into large, jagged shards that can cause serious injury and is considered a hazard in architectural applications. Building codes in many parts of the world restrict the use of annealed glass in areas where there is a high risk of breakage and injury, for example in bathrooms, door panels, fire exits and at low heights in schools or domestic houses. Safety glass, such as laminated or tempered must be used in these settings to reduce risk of injury.

=== Laminated glass ===
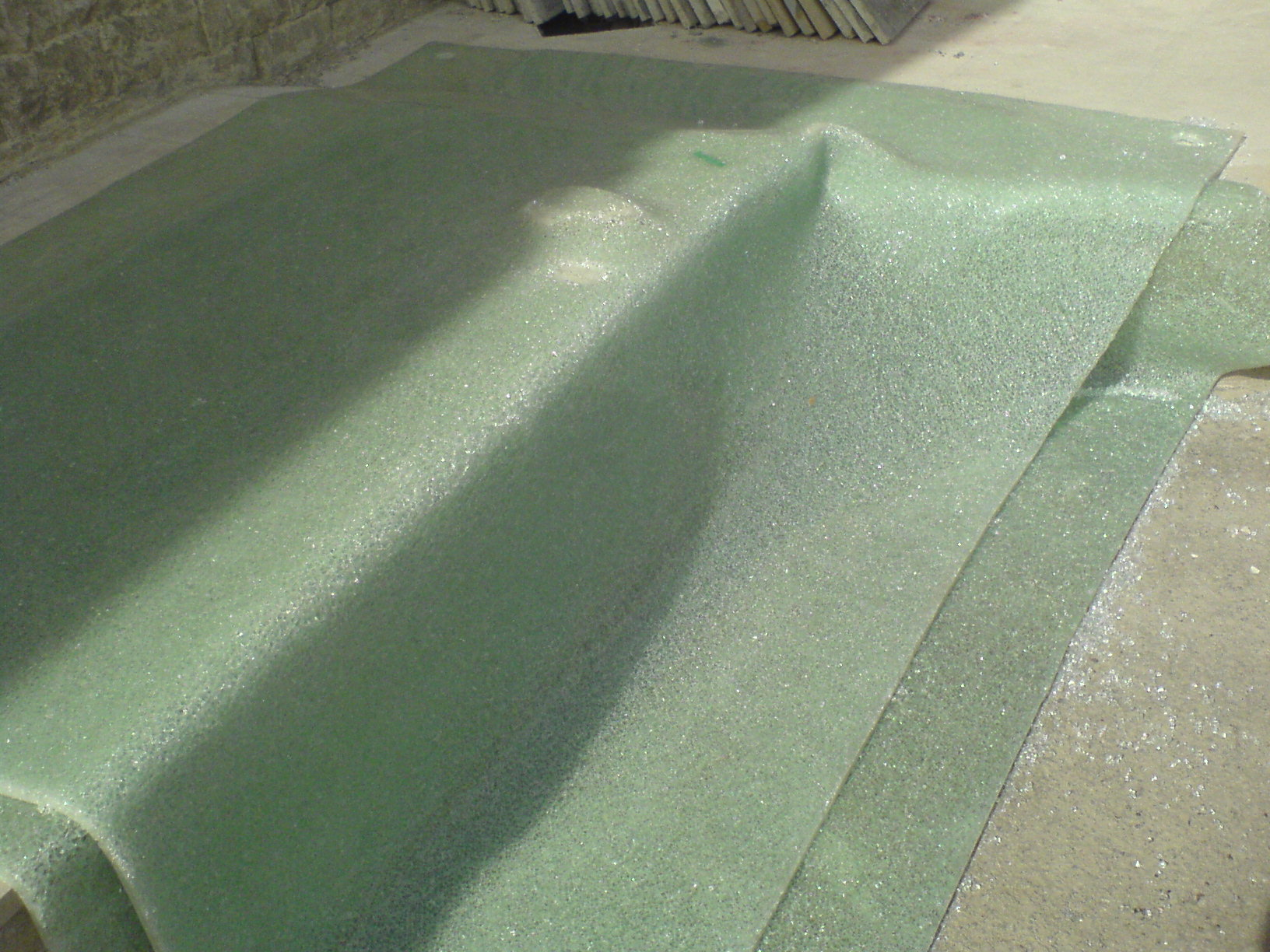
Broken tempered laminated glass "wet blanket effect"

Laminated glass is manufactured by bonding two or more layers of glass together with an interlayer, such as PVB, under heat and pressure, to create a single sheet of glass. When broken, the interlayer keeps the layers of glass bonded and prevents it from breaking apart. The interlayer can also give the glass a higher sound insulation rating.

There are several types of laminated glasses manufactured using different types of glass and interlayers which produce different results when broken.

Laminated glass that is made up of annealed glass is normally used when safety is a concern, but tempering is not an option. Windshields are typically laminated glasses. When broken, the PVB layer prevents the glass from breaking apart, creating a "spider web" cracking pattern.

Tempered laminated glass is designed to shatter into small pieces, preventing possible injury. When both pieces of glass are broken it produces a "wet blanket" effect and it will fall out of its opening.

Heat strengthened laminated glass is stronger than annealed, but not as strong as tempered. It is often used where security is a concern. It has a larger break pattern than tempered, but because it holds its shape (unlike the "wet blanket" effect of tempered laminated glass) it remains in the opening and can withstand more force for a longer period of time, making it much more difficult to get through.

Laminated glass has similar properties to ballistic glass, but the two should not be confused. Both are made using a PVB interlayer, but they have drastically different tensile strength. Ballistic glass and laminated glass are both rated to different standards and have a different shatter pattern.

=== Heat-strengthened glass ===
Heat-strengthened glass, or tempered glass, is glass that has been heat treated to induce surface compression, but not to the extent of causing it to "dice" on breaking in the manner of tempered glass. On breaking, heat-strengthened glass breaks into sharp pieces that are typically somewhat smaller than those found on breaking annealed glass, and is intermediate in strength between annealed and toughened glasses.

Heat-strengthened glass can take a strong direct hit without shattering, but has a weak edge. By simply tapping the edge of heat-strengthened glass with a solid object, it is possible to shatter the entire sheet.

=== Chemically strengthened glass ===
Chemically strengthened glass is a type of glass that has increased strength. When broken it still shatters in long pointed splinters similar to float (annealed) glass. For this reason, it is not considered a safety glass and must be laminated if a safety glass is required. Chemically strengthened glass is typically six to eight times the strength of annealed glass.

The glass is chemically strengthened by submerging the glass in a bath containing a potassium salt (typically potassium nitrate) at 450 °C (842 °F). This causes sodium ions in the glass surface to be replaced by potassium ions from the bath solution.

Unlike toughened glass, chemically strengthened glass may be cut after strengthening, but loses its added strength within the region of approximately 20 mm of the cut. Similarly, when the surface of chemically strengthened glass is deeply scratched, this area loses its additional strength.

Chemically strengthened glass was used on some fighter aircraft canopies.

=== Low-emissivity glass ===
Glass coated with a low-emissivity substance can reflect radiant infrared energy, encouraging radiant heat to remain on the same side of the glass from which it originated, while letting visible light pass. This often results in more efficient windows because radiant heat originating from indoors in winter is reflected back inside, while infrared heat radiation from the sun during summer is reflected away, keeping it cooler inside.

=== Heatable glass ===
Electrically heatable glass is a relatively new product, which helps to find solutions while designing buildings and vehicles. The idea of heating glass is based on usage of energy-efficient low-emissive glass that is generally simple silicate glass with special metallic oxides coating. Heatable glass can be used in all kinds of standard glazing systems, made of wood, plastic, aluminum or steel.

=== Self-cleaning glass ===
A recent (2001 Pilkington Glass) innovation is so-called self-cleaning glass, aimed at building, automotive and other technical applications. A nanometre-scale coating of titanium dioxide on the outer surface of glass introduces two mechanisms which lead to the self-cleaning property. The first is a photo-catalytic effect, in which ultra-violet rays catalyse the breakdown of organic compounds on the window surface; the second is a hydrophilic effect in which water is attracted to the surface of the glass, forming a thin sheet which washes away the broken-down organic compounds.

=== Insulating glass ===
Insulating glass, or double glazing, consists of a window or glazing element of two or more layers of glazing separated by a spacer along the edge and sealed to create a dead air space between the layers. This type of glazing has functions of thermal insulation and noise reduction. When the space is filled with an inert gas it is part of energy conservation sustainable architecture design for low energy buildings.

=== Evacuated glazing ===
A 1994 innovation for insulated glazing is evacuated glass, which as yet is produced commercially only in Japan and China. The extreme thinness of evacuated glazing offers many new architectural possibilities, particularly in building conservation and historicist architecture, where evacuated glazing can replace traditional single glazing, which is much less energy-efficient.

An evacuated glazing unit is made by sealing the edges of two glass sheets, typically by using a solder glass, and evacuating the space inside with a vacuum pump. The evacuated space between the two sheets can be very shallow and yet be a good insulator, yielding insulative window glass with nominal thicknesses as low as 6 mm overall. The reasons for this low thickness are deceptively complex, but the potential insulation is good essentially because there can be no convection or gaseous conduction in a vacuum.

Unfortunately, evacuated glazing does have some disadvantages; its manufacture is complicated and difficult. For example, a necessary stage in the manufacture of evacuated glazing is outgassing; that is, heating it to liberate any gases adsorbed on the inner surfaces, which could otherwise later escape and destroy the vacuum. This heating process currently means that evacuated glazing cannot be toughened or heat-strengthened. If an evacuated safety glass is required, the glass must be laminated. The high temperatures necessary for outgassing also tend to destroy the highly effective "soft" low-emissivity coatings that are often applied to one or both of the internal surfaces (i.e. the ones facing the air gap) of other forms of modern insulative glazing, in order to prevent loss of heat through infrared radiation. Slightly less effective "hard" coatings are still suitable for evacuated glazing, however.

Furthermore, because of the atmospheric pressure present on the outside of an evacuated glazing unit, its two glass sheets must somehow be held apart in order to prevent them flexing together and touching each other, which would defeat the object of evacuating the unit. The task of holding the panes apart is performed by a grid of spacers, which typically consist of small stainless steel discs that are placed around 20 mm apart. The spacers are small enough that they are visible only at very close distances, typically up to 1 m. However, the fact that the spacers will conduct some heat often leads in cold weather to the formation of temporary, grid-shaped patterns on the surface of an evacuated window, consisting either of small circles of interior condensation centred around the spacers, where the glass is slightly colder than average, or, when there is dew outside, small circles on the exterior face of the glass, in which the dew is absent because the spacers make the glass near them slightly warmer.

The conduction of heat between the panes, caused by the spacers, tends to limit evacuated glazing's overall insulative effectiveness. Nevertheless, evacuated glazing is still as insulative as much thicker conventional double glazing and tends to be stronger, since the two constituent glass sheets are pressed together by the atmosphere, and hence react practically as one thick sheet to bending forces. Evacuated glazing also offers very good sound insulation in comparison with other popular types of window glazing.

=== Heat reduction glass ===
One type of heat reduction glass uses radiative cooling. This glass includes a 1.2 micron-thick transparent radiative cooler (TRC) layer of silica, alumina, and titanium oxide upon glass coated with contact lens polymer. The layer permits only visible light to cross, cutting buildings’ cooling costs by as much as one-third. The developers used machine learning and quantum computing to rapidly test models and identify the best alternative.

== Seismic requirements ==
The most current building code enforced in most jurisdictions in the United States is the 2006 International Building Code (IBC, 2006). The 2006 IBC references for the 2005 edition of the standard Minimum Design Loads for buildings and other Structures prepared by the American Society of Civil Engineers (ASCE, 2005) for its seismic provisions. ASCE 7-05 contains specific requirements for nonstructural components including requirements for architectural glass.

== Reflected sunlight ==
If incorrectly designed, concave surfaces with extensive amounts of glass can act as solar concentrators depending on the angle of the sun, potentially injuring people and damaging property.

== See also ==
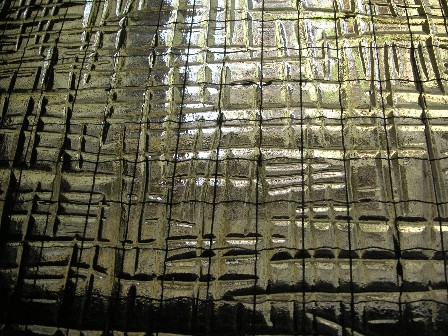
Reinforced figure-rolled glass in "amber" colour

- Building construction – Process of building or assembling a building or infrastructure
- Glass in green buildings – Material usage in sustainable architecture
- Glass museums and galleries
- Glazing – Part of a wall or window, made of glass
- Heatable glass – Heating using transparent, electrically conductive coating on glass
- Insulated glazing – Construction element consisting of at least two glass plates
- Leadlight – Type of windows
- Quadruple glazing – Type of insulated glazing
- Solar thermal collector – Device that collects heat
- British and Irish stained glass (1811–1918)
- Stained glass – Colored glass and works that are made from it
