= Plate glass =

Glass made of flat sheets

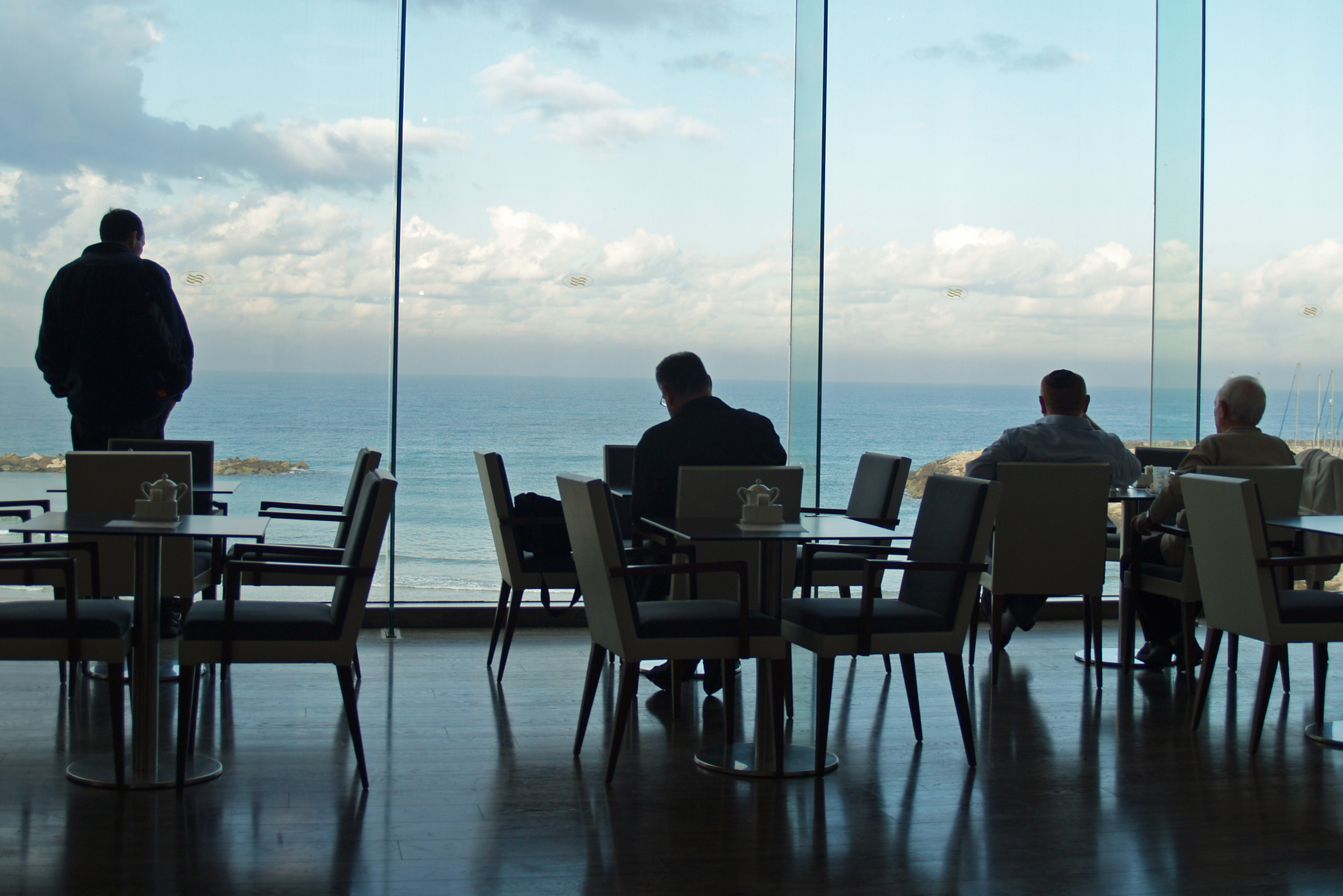
Plate glass is often used in windows.

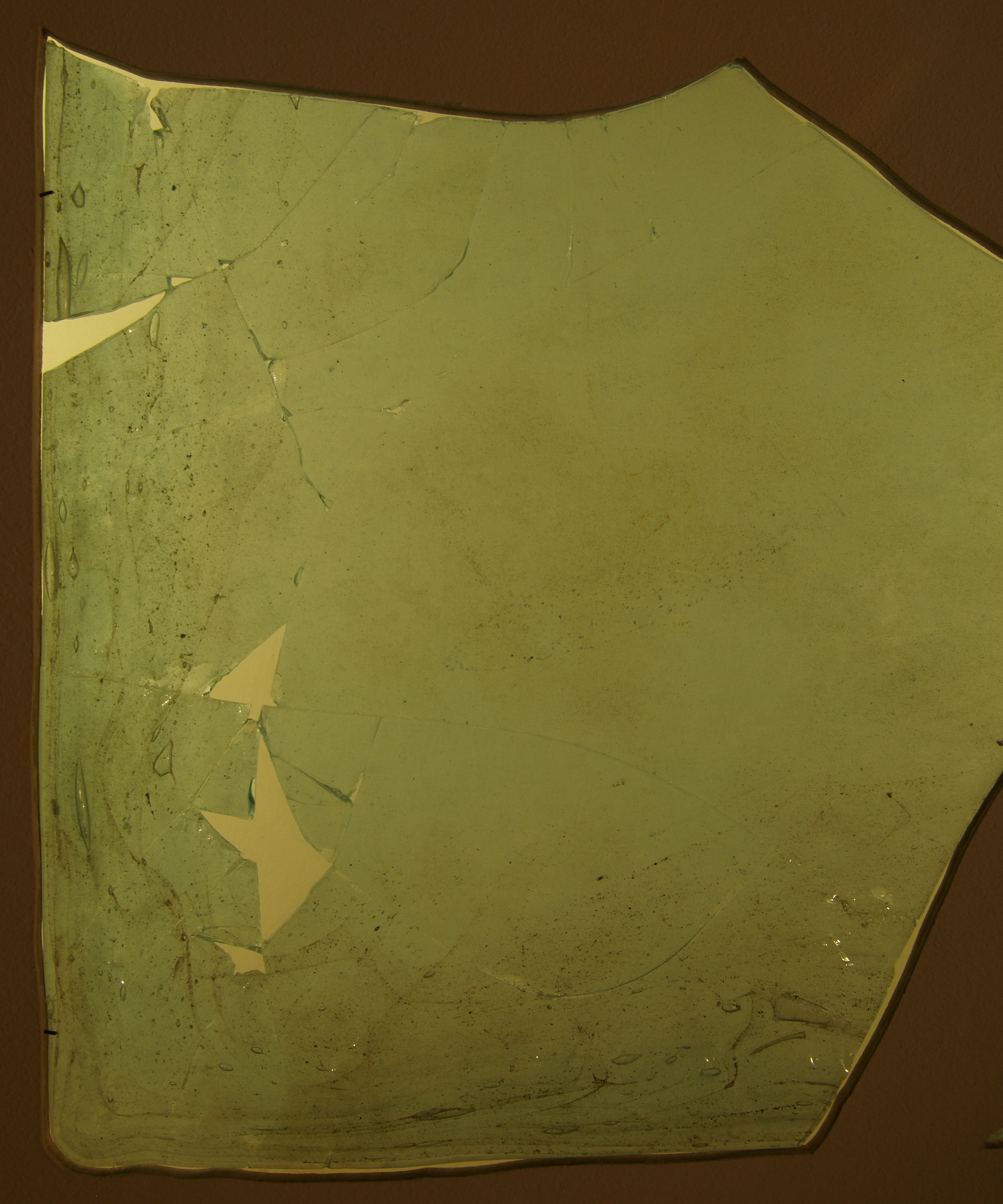
Fragment of a Roman window glass plate dated to 1st to 4th century CE

Plate glass, flat glass or sheet glass are types of glass produced in sheet form, commonly used for windows, glass doors, transparent walls, windscreens and mirrors. For modern architectural and automotive applications, the flat glass is sometimes bent after production of the plane sheet. Flat glass stands in contrast to container glass (used for bottles, jars, cups) and glass fibre (used for thermal insulation, in fibreglass composites, and for optical communication).

Flat glass has a higher magnesium oxide and sodium oxide content than container glass, and a lower silica, calcium oxide, and aluminium oxide content. From the lower soluble oxide content comes the better chemical durability of container glass against water, which is required especially for storage of beverages and food.

Most flat glass is soda–lime glass, mainly produced by the float glass process since the 1950s. Other processes for making flat glass include:

- Broad sheet method (13th century)
- Window crown glass technique (14th century)
- Blown plate method (17th century)
- Plate polishing (17th century)
- Cylinder blown sheet method
- Machine drawn cylinder sheet method (early 20th century)
- Rolling (rolled plate glass, figure rolled glass) (19th century)
- Fourcault process (1900s)
- Overflow downdraw method (1960s)

The term plate glass universities is used in the United Kingdom to describe a group – or generation – of universities (in an acknowledgement of the term red brick universities, used for an older generation of establishments).

== Quality and damage ==
Scratches can occur on sheet of glass from accidental causes. In glass trade terminology these include "block reek" produced in polishing, "runner-cut" or “over/under grind” caused by edge grinding, or a "sleek" or hairline scratch, as well as "crush" or "rub" on the surface.

== See also ==
- Architectural glass
