= List of Blackford County Glass Factories =

This is a list of glass factories that operated in Blackford County, Indiana, United States. Natural gas (and later crude oil) was discovered in Blackford County in 1887. This discovery marked the start of Blackford County's participation in the Indiana Gas Boom. Manufacturers, especially glass makers, were lured to the area with promises of free gas, free land, and (in some cases) cash subsidies. Hartford City Glass Company, Sneath Glass Company, and Johnston Glass Company were the largest glass companies during the gas boom. The current Hartford Glass Company is the longest lived. During the 1890s, the Hartford City Glass Company was the third-largest window glass producer in the United States, and Sneath Glass Company was the country's largest producer of lantern globes.

During the early 1900s, gas supplies gradually became depleted—and the East Central Indiana Gas Boom gradually came to an end. Many factories closed or moved. In the case of Hartford City's glass factories, the larger and better-managed factories (such as the large American Window Glass plant, Sneath Glass, and Johnston Glass) continued to operate, while the smaller glass works closed or were absorbed by other companies.

== Glass capital ==
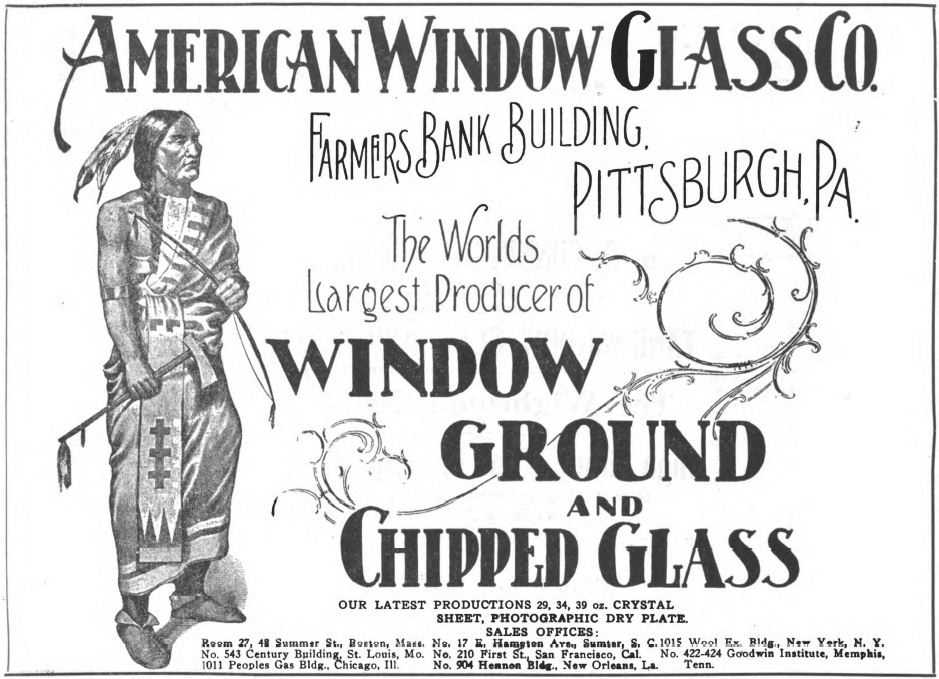
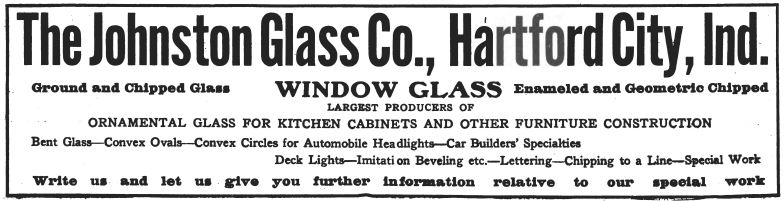
Blackford County's leading glass companies during the 1900s.

For a brief period, residents of Hartford City (the county seat of Blackford County) thought their city would become the window glass capital of the world. The city was already the home of one of the largest window glass plants in the nation, a bottle-making plant, and multiple glassware producers. During the spring of 1900, rumors circulated that the American Window Glass trust, which had acquired over 40 glass works in 1899, planned to move production from some of its smaller plants to its large Hartford City plant. If the Hartford City plant would have its capacity expanded equal to the capacity of the plants to be consolidated, then Hartford City would have "become the greatest window glass town in the world." The plant would have employed nearly 1000 people, and equal the largest window glass plant in the world in capacity. That plant in combination with Hartford City's other window glass factories, and not even considering the flint glass plants or bottle plants, would make the city's window glass capacity the highest in the world. However, the large Hartford City plant was not expanded, and continued to have a capacity of 104 pots—keeping it the third largest window glass plant in the United States, and largest west of Pennsylvania.

== Dunkirk ==
A small portion of Dunkirk, Indiana, is located in Blackford County—and Dunkirk was the location of numerous glass factories. The Dunkirk factories were not located within Blackford County, so they are not listed in the table below. Seven Dunkirk glass factories, employing a total of 1,108 people, were inspected by the state in 1898. Those factories were: Bates Window Glass Company, Beatty-Brady Glass Company, Dunkirk Window Glass Company, Enterprise Window Glass Company, Gem Window Glass Works, Maring, Hart and Company, and Ohio Flint Glass Company.

== Glass men ==
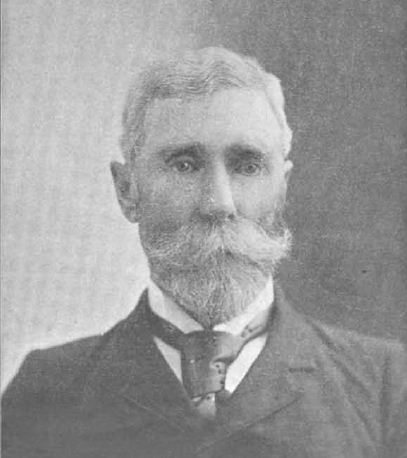
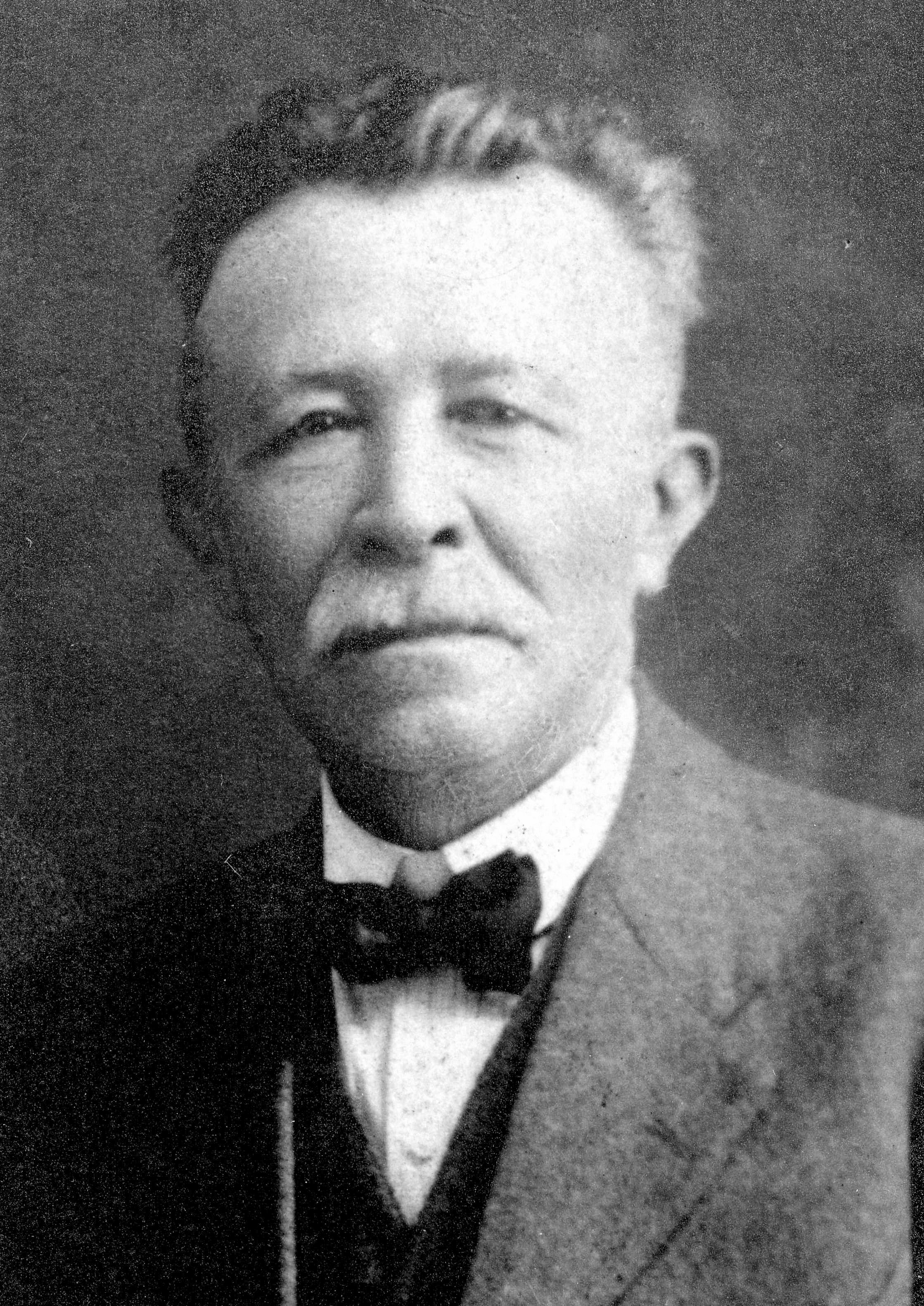
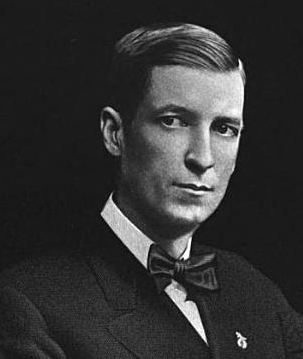
Hartford City glass men Richard Heagany, Henry Crimmel, and J. R. Johnston

Local capitalist Henry B. "H.B." Smith (1847–1909) was president of Hartford City's Citizen's Bank. His participation in the glass industry was as a financial stakeholder and officer of the Hartford City Glass Company, and later as a director of the American Window Glass Company. Smith was also involved with two business blocks and railroading. Glassmaker Richard Heagany (1835–1925) was the founder of Hartford City Glass Company, and had over 25 years of glass-making experience. Before moving to Hartford City, he had been superintendent of the largest window glass factory in New York, and founded a window glass works in Kokomo, Indiana. Henry Crimmel (1844–1917) provided the glassmaking expertise for Hartford City's Sneath Glass Company. Crimmel had about "half a century" of glassmaking experience, and helped start the Sneath Glass Company and several glass companies in Ohio. John Rodgers Johnston (1867–1920) was one of Hartford City's glassmakers and financiers. Johnson was an officer and plant manager of Hartford City Glass, founder of Johnston Glass Company in Hartford City, and founder of the Johnston Brokerage in Pittsburgh. He was also involved with companies as diverse as the Berghoff Brewing Company, Newsome Feed and Grain Company, and Potomac Valley Orchard Company. George Fulton (1872–1930), former secretary-treasurer and plant manager at Johnston Glass, founded Hartford City's Fulton Glass Company in 1929. Heagany, Crimmel, Johnston, and Fulton all had decades of glassmaking experience and provided on–site management for Hartford City's glass factories.

== Glass factories ==
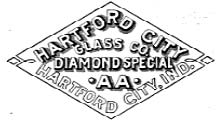
Blackford County's leading glass companies during the 1890s.

Blackford County's glass factories are listed below in the sortable list. The first five categories in the list can be sorted. The list's default sort orders the properties alphabetically by name. Notes are listed in the last section. The figures for employees (where available) are the largest number from inspections by the state of Indiana in 1898, 1901, 1903, and 1910.

	Company	City	Start	End	Employees	Notes
1	American Window Glass factory number 3	Hartford City	1899	1929	500	American Window Glass trust purchased Hartford City Glass Company in 1899. Plant produced window, ground, and chipped glass. Factory was third largest window glass plant in the United States, and used 2 tanks with 104 pot capacity. Employee count of 500 is for 1910. Glass blowing machinery gradually caused employee counts to decrease. Superior technology used by competitors caused difficulties for the company during the 1920s. The Hartford City plant was closed in 1929, although the company kept a few other plants open.
2	American Window Glass factory number 32	Hartford City	1899	1905	65	Former Jones Glass Company purchased by American Window Glass Company. Employee count of 65 in 1903. Plant was sold in 1905.
3	Blackford Glass Company	Hartford City	1901	1903	65	Employee count of 65 for window glass maker in 1903. Moved to Vincennes, Indiana in 1903, taking workforce of French-speaking Belgians from Hartford City. Continued operations in Vincennes until 1966. In Vincennes, company employed 200 in 1950.
4	Clelland Glass Company	Hartford City	1901	1905	67	Started by James Clelland and J.R. Johnston in 1901 after they purchased the Hurrle Glass Works. Employee count of 67 for 1903. Closed in 1905. Purchased at auction by J. R. Johnston in 1905.
5	Diamond Flint Glass Company	Hartford City	1899	1905	90	Bottle maker employed 90 in 1901. Factory was destroyed by fire in 1905. Moved to Jackson, Ohio.
6	Fulton Glass Company	Hartford City	1929	1986		Founded in 1929 by ex-Johnston Glass plant manager George T. Fulton. Hartford City plant destroyed by fire in 1966. Company headquarters continued in Hartford City whlle the Vincinnes plant still operated. Sold in 1986.
7	Hartford City Flint Glass Company	Hartford City	1898	1908?	75	Produced bottles and jars. Employed 75 in 1903. Plant destroyed by fire in 1904, but rebuilt. Moved to Ohio by 1908.
8	Hartford City Glass Company	Hartford City	1890	1899	600	One of largest window glass makers in world during the 1890s. Plant occupied 25 acres (10 ha), and was "the largest grinding and chipping establishment in the United States" in 1896. Employee count of 600 in 1898. Purchased by American Window Glass and became plant number 3.
9	Hartford Glass Company	Hartford City	1939	Still operating		Window glass, mirrors. Operated by Reidy family.
10	Hurrle Glass Company	Hartford City	1898	1901	60	Window glass factory started by Charles J. Hurrle and investors in 1898. Employee count of 60 in 1901. Sold in 1901 to James Clelland and J.R. Johnston to start Clelland Glass Company.
11	Johnston Glass Company	Hartford City	1900	1966	200	Window glass company founded by former secretary and plant manager of Hartford City Glass Company, J. R. Johnston. Also made ornamental, bent, and chipped glass. Employee count of 200 for 1903.
12	Jones Glass Company	Hartford City	1898	1899	60	Window glass factory began in 1898 with a foreign workforce, and employed 60. Company was acquired by American Window Glass Company in 1899 and became factory number 32.
13	Millgrove Glass Company	Millgrove	1898	1911	112	112 employees in 1910. Made glass bottles. Moved to Upland, Indiana, in 1911 when natural gas became depleted.
14	National Window Glass Company	Montpelier	1899	1904	129	Made window glass, changed name from National Window and Bent Glass Company in 1903. Employee count of 129 in 1901.
15	Sans Pareil Bottle Company	Hartford City	1900	1902	110	Organized June 1900 by Father Charles Dhe, J. R. Johnston, and others. Employee count of 110 for bottle maker in 1901. Idle plant bought by J. R. Johnston (Johnston Glass Company) in January 1902.
16	Sinclair Glass Company	Hartford City	1966	present		Operated in former Sneath and Johnston Glass plants making ornamental glass. Still exists as division of Middletown Enterprises.It is the bigger of the two remaining glass factories.
17	Sneath Glass Company	Hartford City	1894	1952	170	Relocated from Tiffin, Ohio. Originally produced lantern globes and founts. One of only three companies in the 1890s that produced ruby globes. Made kitchenware for cabinet makers such as Sellers and Hoosier during the first third of 20th century. Later made products for refrigerators. Employee count of 170 in 1901.
