= Lehr (glassmaking) =

Kiln used for annealing of glass

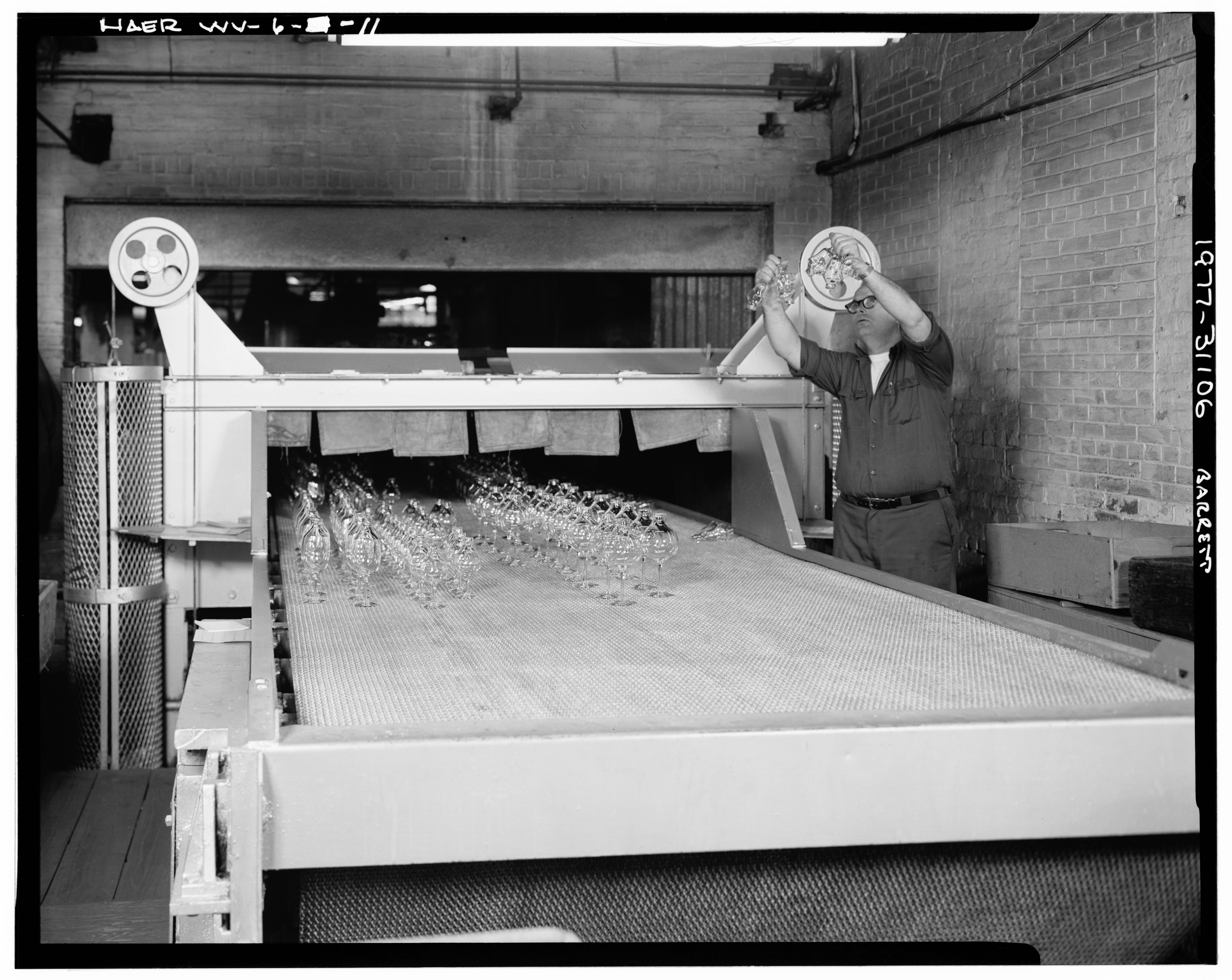
Inspector at the cool end of a lehr

In the manufacture of sheet glass and glassware, a lehr oven is a long kiln with an end-to-end temperature gradient, which is used for annealing newly made glass objects that are transported through the temperature gradient either on rollers or on a conveyor belt. The annealing renders glass into a stronger material with fewer internal stresses, and with a lower probability of breaking.

The rapid cooling of molten glass results in an uneven temperature distribution throughout the material. This temperature differential results in mechanical stresses throughout the molten glass, which may be sufficient to cause the material to crack as it cools to ambient temperature or to make it susceptible to cracking during later use, either spontaneously or due to mechanical or thermal shock. To prevent such material weaknesses, objects made from molten glass are annealed by gradual cooling in a lehr oven, from the annealing point, a temperature just below the solidification temperature of the glass. In the process of annealing glass, the temperature is first equalised by holding or "soaking" the glass at the annealing point for a period of time that depends on the maximum thickness of the glass. The glass is then slowly cooled at a rate that depends upon the maximum thickness of the glass, ranging from tens of degrees Celsius per hour (for thin slabs of glass) to fractions of a degree Celsius per hour (for thick slabs of glass).
