= Fourcault process =

Method of manufacturing flat glass

The Fourcault process is a method of manufacturing plate glass. First developed in Belgium by Émile Fourcault (1862–1919) during the early 1900s, the process was used globally. Fourcault is an example of a "vertical draw" process, in that the glass is drawn against gravity in an upward direction. Gravity forces influence parts of the process.

== Process ==
Fourcault drawing line with detail of the Debiteuse (red)

The Fourcault process requires a "pit" or drawing area and an assembly of machines to draw up the ribbon of glass while performing actions upon it that ensure desired quality and process yields. Today most glass manufacture has a "hot end" where the products are made. Fourcault is no exception.

The action in Fourcault happens "at the draw", or area where the glass is taken from a liquid state into the start of the process needed to make it into flat glass.

At the bottom of the draw is the "pit" or place where the molten glass is sufficiently cooled to be close to forming temperature. The cooling process uses a device known as a "canal", a box-shaped structure which conveys the glass from the refining area to the pit.

The canal links the pit with the "refining" area, a section of the glass furnace that removes gas bubbles and other sources of imperfection. Since refining requires much higher temperatures to release gas bubbles than those required to form the glass it is not possible to draw directly from the refining area, hence the need for canals.

== Forming ==
The Fourcault process uses a ceramic die to shape fused (or molten) glass into a ribbon of rectangular cross section. The die, known as a debiteuse, floats in the molten glass inside of the pit to a prescribed depth which pushes a part of the molten glass slightly above the top surface of the die. A slot is cut through the center of the debiteuse, which is shaped to produce the best quality of glass.

The debiteuse is the starting point of the vertical draw, where the glass begins to change from a hot syrupy mass into useful flat glass. We will call the glass from the point of the debiteuse until it is cut a "ribbon".

The base of the ribbon is shielded from heat radiation from the fused glass so that it continues to hold the shape imparted to it by the debiteuse. This cooling preserves the rectangular cross section of the drawn glass by cooling the ribbon glass below the temperature where it would collapse into a column or break back into the melted glass. It is especially important to shield the outside edges of the ribbon from heat so that they are firmer and will hold the rest of the ribbon in a proper shape. In some cases manufacturers will allow the edges to form thicker "bulbs", which are removed after final cutting.

Immediately after being drawn the ribbon is cooled using mechanical coolers so that it maintains its rectangular shape in two dimensions, but assumes a ribbon like structure that extends down into the Debi and upwards into a drawing assembly. This mechanical cooling allows the ribbon to hold its integrity. In the author's experience the mechanical coolers used water, contained in specially shaped radiators, to remove heat radiated by the ribbon.

Sometimes a mild vacuum is applied to the ribbon in this early part of the process since mechanical cooling can induce air currents which impact upon surface quality.

== Quenching ==
Some manufacturers also will apply sulfur dioxide gas during the draw in order to change the chemistry of the glass on the surface. By changing the chemistry it is possible to affect the surface characteristics of the glass, improving its quality and durability.

Glass rollers hold the ribbon throughout various parts of the process, supporting its weight and continuing the drawing process.

The process continues as the ribbon is drawn upwards into a chimney like structure, where it is quenched or rapidly cooled. When the ribbon reaches the end of the process it is scored, or cut, and then removed for further processing in discrete sheets of flat glass.

The "bulb edges" are recycled as cullet (flawed glass which is remelted) or were resold for shelving or displays. Sometimes flawed parts of the sheets were removed, leaving behind decent quality flat glass.

== Operations ==
Time, speed and spacing of the various phases of the process are critical factors in the Fourcault process. Fourcault process machine operators require experience in order to judge placement of the die, location of various parts of the process, and rates of draw. These must be balanced against glass quality and the age of the draw.

As the draw continues the glass in the pit grows cooler and cooler, eventually leading to failures or diminished quality. The draw must be stopped, the pit must be "heated back" and then the process can continue anew.

Glass chemistry has a huge impact on the process since it controls the melting, forming and annealing temperatures, liquidus temperature (point where various chemicals that make up the glass start to crystallize out of the glass) and rates of change of characteristics of the glass itself.

Occasionally the ribbon will break or crack, leading to failure of the drawing process. Such breaks, known as "checks" can be alleviated by using proper operating parameters. Sometimes an expedient measure, using a portable source of heat, can be used to make the checks migrate to the edge of the ribbon where they disappear. The author has even seen crude torches made of wood which can migrate the checks.

The resultant product is a form of flat glass which is suitable for lesser quality uses. Due to process instabilities Fourcault process glass can have waves, seeds (small gas bubbles) or stones (undissolved materials). This distorts the image seen through the glass. Fourcault glass is still being made as an architectural glass for historical restoration of buildings.

In terms of economics and product quality the Fourcault process has been supplanted in many applications by the Pilkington developed "Float" process. The Float process lets the molten glass settle on top of a pool of liquid tin, so that gravity creates a flat sheet. Due to various chemistry and physical aspects of window glass the Pilkington Float process produces a vastly superior product.
