= Irving Wightman Colburn =

American inventor and manufacturer

- Born: 16 May 1861; Fitchburg, Mass
- Died: 4 September 1917 (aged 56); Lucas County, Ohio
- Resting place: Woodlawn Cemetery, Toledo, Ohio
- Occupations: inventor and manufacturer
- Known for: glass
- Spouse: Ida E. Colburn

Irving Wightman Colburn (16 May 1861 – 4 September 1917) was an American inventor and manufacturer.

In 1898, Colburn applied for a patent for a "Glass Working Machine" that could make hollow-bodied glass containers like bottles. The patent was granted on March 7, 1899, Patent Number US620,642. The use of the patent is unknown.

Colburn developed a process for the production of continuous flat glass disks which made the mass production for window panes possible. Colburn began his experiments in 1899. In one patent for a machine to produce flat glass on 25 March 1902. He created the Colburn Machine Glass Co. in August 1906. In 1908 he installed two machines, before the technology had developed, and in 1911 he became bankrupt. Toledo Glass Company bought Colburn's patents in 1912. He then improved the process with Toledo Glass, and its first successful result occurred on 25 November 1913. The company then became the Libbey-Owens Sheet Glass company in 1916.
