= Blenko Glass Company =

American glass company headquartered in Milton, West Virginia

- Formerly: Eureka Art Glass
- Type: Private
- Industry: Glassware
- Founded: 1922
- Founder: William J. Blenko
- Headquarters: Milton, West Virginia
- Key people: William J. Blenko, William H. Blenko Sr.
- Products: hand-blown glassware
- Owner: Blenko family
- Number of employees: 160 (1965)
- Website: www.blenko.com

Blenko Glass Company is an art glass company that began producing in 1922 under the name Eureka Art Glass Company. The company name was changed to Blenko Glass Company in 1930. Originally an antique flat glass company, it was founded by Englishman William J. Blenko (1854–1933). Blenko came to the United States to make glass in 1893. Over the next 25 years, he established glass factories in Indiana, Pennsylvania, and West Virginia, all of which failed. His fourth glass factory, which began production in 1922, found long-term success. This factory is located in Milton, West Virginia, and Blenko family members still lead the company.

William Blenko could make numerous colors of flat glass, and his products were used by other companies to make stained glass windows. The glass was made using a patented variation of an older method for making window glass called the cylinder method. Blenko used glassblowers that blew a glass cylinder into a mold. The cylinder was cut and flattened in an oven. All glassblowing was done by human glassblowers instead of a machine. The company's biggest challenge was to get purchasers of glass to accept an American-made product, and Blenko's three earlier failed glass works all had the same problem.

Blenko's son William H. Blenko (1897–1969) joined the company in 1923. The Great Depression in 1929 caused a decrease in demand for antique window glass, so the younger Blenko was instrumental in getting the company to begin producing glassware in addition to flat glass. This was a successful endeavor as the company utilized the vast skill set the elder Blenko had for making numerous colors of glass. During the 1940s the company established the practice of employing a designer, and the designer's creations were sold as art glass—a subset of glassware. Production of glassware and flat glass also continued. The company survived difficult times during the 21st century, including a management change and a bankruptcy. Blenko glassware and art glass are valued by collectors, and both are still produced in the West Virginia glass works.

== Three failures ==
=== First try ===
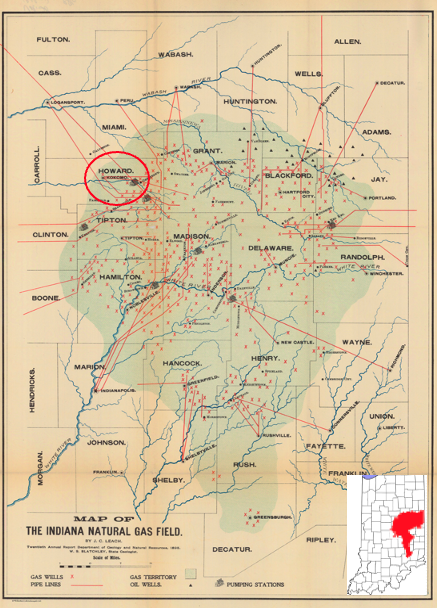
1895 map with Kokomo circled

William John Blenko, the founder of Blenko Glass Company, was born in London during 1854. At the age of 10 he began working as an apprentice in a London bottle glass works, where he learned the basics of glassmaking. He studied chemistry and learned to produce sheet glass. Producing glass in England, he shipped his product to the United States. Blenko's first attempt to start a glass factory in the United States was in Kokomo, Indiana, during January 1893. His plant site was adjacent to the Belt Railroad, and he brought his own equipment. (Note: In 1886, a large quantity of natural gas was discovered in Indiana. Affecting 25 counties in the state including Howard County and the city of Kokomo, the amount of gas was large enough that it could be used for fuel. This low-cost fuel attracted glass factories, and by 1893 the number of glass factories in the state had increased to 45 from only one in 1886.) An 1896 insurance map shows a small unnamed glass works next to the Belt Railroad that was very small compared to the other two glass works in town. (Note: A Sanborn Fire Insurance map for Kokomo as of March 1896 shows Pittsburgh Plate Glass (image 13), Opalescent Glass Works (image 19), and a small unnamed glass factory (image 19) near the Belt Railroad.)

Blenko's Kokomo glass business failed after about ten years. The reasons for the failure are: (1) an economic depression (the Panic of 1893) and additional recessions throughout the decade; (2) increased foreign competition because of the Wilson–Gorman Tariff Act of 1894; and (3) Americans believed that European glass was superior. It is believed that Blenko resorted to shipping his glass to England, and then back, to give the appearance of European glass that appealed to potential customers. (Note: A newspaper advertisement from 1956 repeats the claim of shipping to and from England.) After the business failed, Blenko and his family moved back to London during July 1905. (Note: While a newspaper said that Blenko's family moved to England during 1905, another source says that Blenko returned to England in 1904 to start a glass factory.) Producing the same glass in England, Blenko was able to sell his imported glass to glass studios in the United States. Blenko and family returned to the United States about 14 months later, and decided to have a permanent home in Pennsylvania.

=== More tries ===
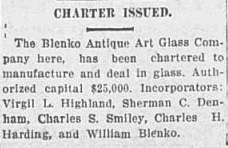
Clarksburg - July 1911

Blenko's next attempt to start a glass works in America was at Point Marion, Pennsylvania. A fire insurance map published September 1909 shows a small "Blenko Glass Works" located near the Baltimore & Ohio Railroad line along with several other glass factories. Blenko abandoned this glass works when he built a factory in Clarksburg, West Virginia, where fuel was cheaper. Construction of the Clarksburg glass works began during late summer 1911. A significant factor in the 1913 failure of the Clarksburg works, known as the Blenko Antique Art Glass Company, was the Underwood-Simmons Act that reduced the tariff rate on imported glass.

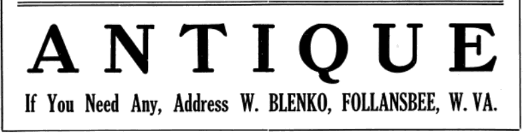
William Blenko advertisement in a glass trade magazine, July 1917

After the third failure, Blenko remained in the United States. A 1916 newspaper notice shows that a William Blenko had a telephone line in Lancaster, Ohio. A stained glass trade magazine for July 1917 contained an advertisement at the bottom of page one that simply said "Antique - if you want any, address W. Blenko" with an address of Follansbee, West Virginia. By July 1920 Blenko was apparently living on Wheeling Street in Lancaster, Ohio. He posted in classified advertising that he wanted a position in glassmaking, and that he could make "every variety of color including opal and opalescent".

== Early history ==
=== Eureka Art Glass ===
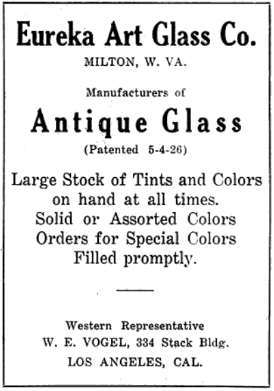
Advertising for Blenko using original name, Eureka Art Glass, in 1926

In the January 1922 edition of a glass trade magazine, it was noted that a "W. Blenko, of Lancaster, Ohio" recently purchased land at Huntington, West Virginia, and he expected a plant for the manufacture of colored antique glass would be operating by mid-March 1922. Blenko named his new glass business Eureka Art Glass Company. (Note: Gallerist Damon Crain wrote that Blenko's Eureka Art Glass Company was founded in December 1921.) By 1923 the company was listed as an antiques and specialties business, and it had eight employees. A new Eureka employee was William Henry Blenko Sr., who joined his father's company during the year. Born in 1897, he was described as "energetic and commercially astute" and an important contributor to the company's success.

Instead of using the new automated Colburn process to make flat glass, or the Lubbers machine to blow the glass without human glassblowers, Blenko's antique flat glass was made using a variation of the older cylinder method. Blenko's process involved hand blowing the glass into a cylinder inside of a mold, cutting the glass lengthwise, and flattening it in an oven—a system that made the glass appear old. William Blenko filed for a patent on this process in 1924, and the patent was granted in 1926.

Another innovation for the elder Blenko was his 1924 success in developing a formula for ruby-red glass that could be reheated without altering its color. By 1926, Eureka Art Glass could replicate most of the glass used in old European stained glass windows. One use of Eureka Art Glass in this form was for the stained glass windows of the Liverpool Cathedral in England in 1927. Business improved enough that in 1928 plans were made to erect a larger plant.

=== Glassware production begins ===
1928 advertisement for Carbone

An economic depression began in the United States during August 1929, becoming known as the Great Depression. The downturn caused a sharp decrease in demand for stained glass. To keep the business from failing, William Henry Blenko championed producing an additional line of glass: decorative glassware. Because the Blenkos only knew how to make flat glass, they hired two Swedish-American brothers from the Huntington Tumbler Company to train Eureka employees in glassware production. The brothers were Louis Miller (a finisher) and Axel Muller (a glassblower), and they had been trained at the Kosta glass works in Sweden.

The Eureka glassware products were originally sold by Carbone and Sons of Boston, which was a reseller of high-quality Italian goods. Eureka wares had Italian and Scandinavian influences on their designs, and took advantage of the company's ability to create hundreds of shades of colored glass. Carbone's sales brochure called the glassware "Kenova" glass, and said it was made in the foothills of West Virginia by foreign craftsmen. Aware that glassware made by Eureka Art Glass could have trouble competing with European makers, an editorial in the May 1932 issue of Carbone's sales brochure known as The Shard described tool marks and unevenness in hand blown glassware as qualities to be desired. The writer of the article was "W.H.B", and one author says the writer was "presumably William Henry Blenko".

=== Big changes in 1930s ===
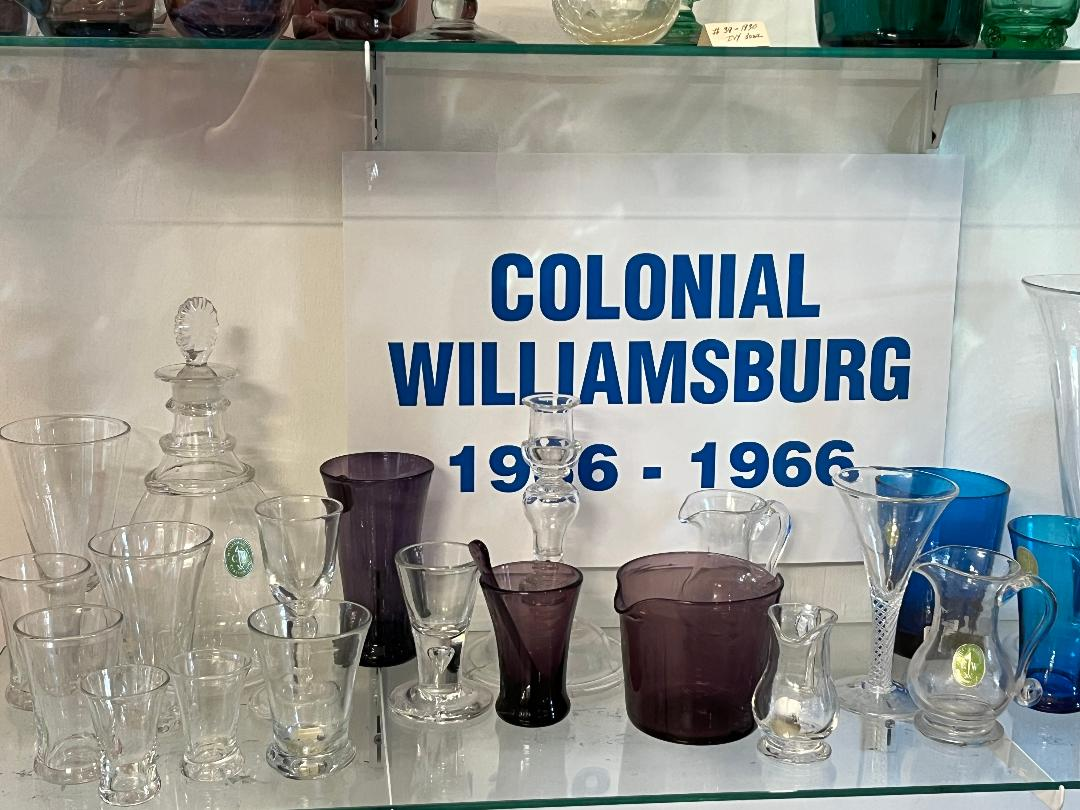
Colonial Williamsburg glass display

Eureka Art Glass Company was renamed Blenko Glass Company during August 1930. An advertisement in the December 1931 edition of a Charleston newspaper said that "distinctive and different hand made" glassware could be purchased at the Milton factory, and used the name Blenko Glass Company. During 1932, Blenko glass was used for windows in the American Memorial chapel on the Meuse-Argonne battlefield at Romagna, France. The artists designing the windows preferred the Blenko glass because of the colors available and the texture of the glass. William J. Blenko died suddenly on November 24, 1933, at the age of 79. His son, William Henry Blenko Sr. became company president.

After discussions that occurred in 1936, the Blenko Glass Company was contracted in 1937 to produce all glass reproductions for the Colonial Williamsburg restoration project. (Note: Three additional sources, two 1937 editions of newspapers and a museum's book, use 1937 as the year Blenko received the contract to produce glassware for Colonial Williamsburg. Two other sources, Shotwell and a Blenko timeline from 2002, use 1936.) The original quality and shapes of the Williamsburg glassware were determined by glass fragments found on site. Using the company's old-style process, Blenko glassblowers were able to replicate the original glassware. For its own line of glassware, the company began producing a somewhat rectangular water bottle in 1938, which is still being produced in the 21st century.

== Post war history ==
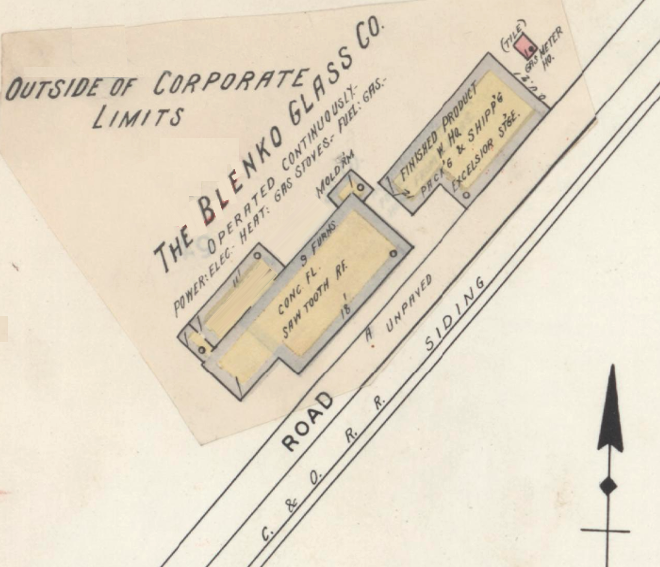
Map showing Blenko factory in 1944

During 1947 the company hired Winslow Anderson as its first full-time designer, and the company began to establish itself as a leader in contemporary art glass. (Note: Art glass is considered glassware made more for ornamental purposes than utilitarian, and is typically made in limited quantities.) During the same year, the company received a new charter on May 1. The firm was incorporated by "W. H. Blenko, Marion H. Blenko, and W. H. Blenko Jr." with a capitalization of $250,000. (Note: Marion Hunt Blenko (1900–1989) was the wife of Willam H. Blenko Sr. She would eventually be the secretary-treasurer of the board of directors of Blenko Glass Company. She was also the daughter of Henry Hunt, of Hunt Stained Glass Studios in Pittsburgh.) Blenko's son, William H. Blenko Jr., had joined the company in 1946—a third generation of the Blenko family.

The Blenko Glass plant employed 115 people near the end of 1950. Daily production was about 1,000 square feet of stained glass sheets and about 3,000 pieces of glassware. William H. Blenko Sr. was the president, and his son William H. Blenko Jr. was company secretary and plant manager. The factory was producing about 280 types of glassware sold by retailers throughout the world. Its flat glass was produced in about 1,000 different tints.

In 1955 Blenko Glass became the first American manufacturer of a thick slab type of glass previously made in France known as dalle de verre. (Note: The term "dalle de verre" translates from French to "glass slab".) Blenko's dalle de verre was used in the 1964 New York World's Fair at the Hall of Science. By the beginning of 1965, Blenko had grown to 160 employees, and continued to produce glass using its handcrafted method.

=== Visitor Center ===
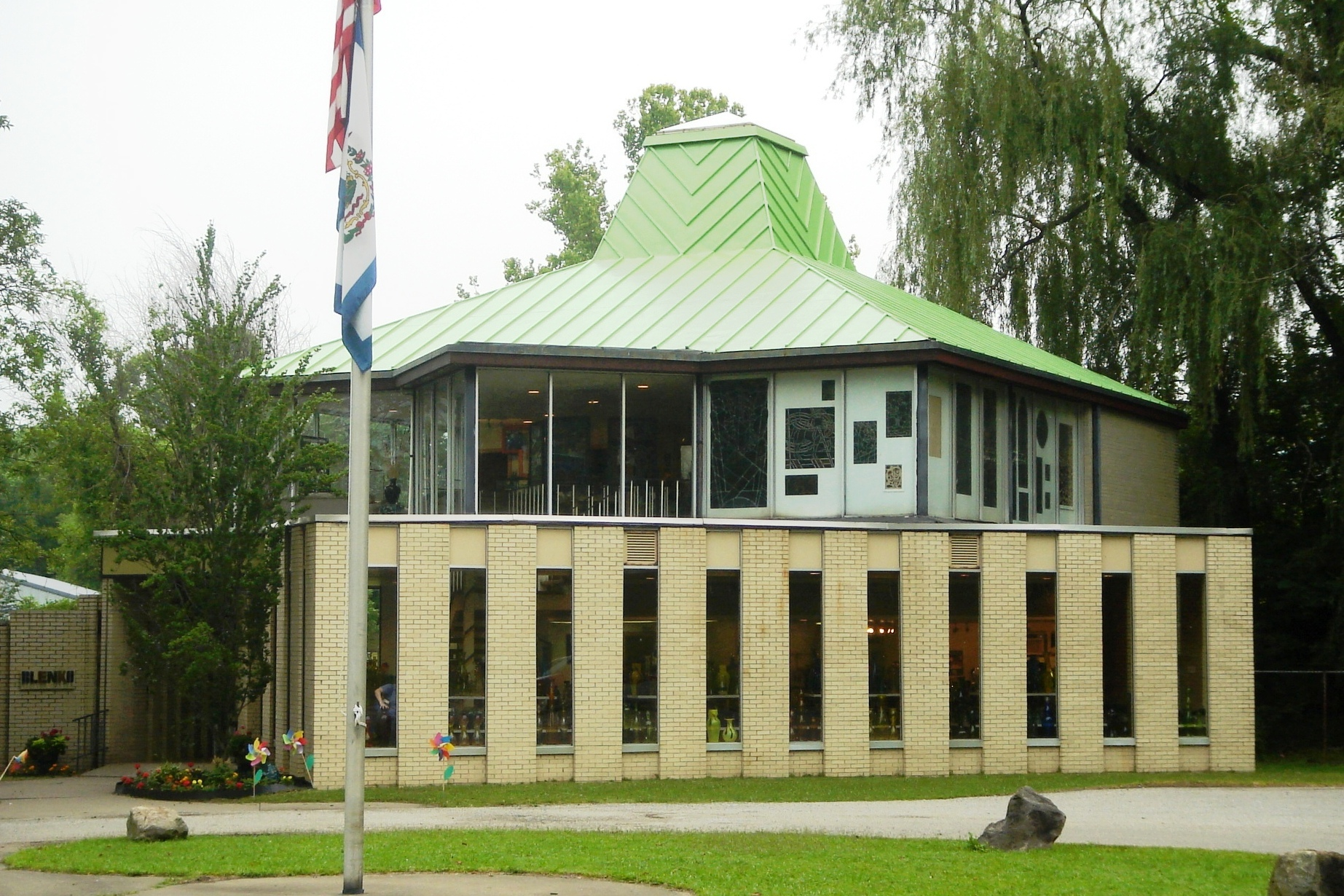
Blenko Glass Company Visitor Center in 2006

William H. Blenko's wish for a visitor center became reality when the center was dedicated in 1966. The two-story building has an outlet on the first floor that sells factory seconds that have minor flaws. The upstairs is a museum with products on display such as stained glass, the Colonial Williamsburg restoration glass, and collectable pieces. It is also the starting point for tours of the factory.

Blenko died on March 11, 1969, only three years after the visitor center dedication. His son, William H. Blenko Jr., became company president. In 1972, the Blenko Visitor Center and Museum was visited by as many as 2,000 people per day during the tourist season. Stained glass windows made by Blenko were still popular in 1974, and a major reason was the "vivid, clear colors" of the glass.

== End of the 20th century ==
During the 1980s and 1990s, the company became the manufacturer of various award trophies, such as the Country Music Award and an Indy Racing League award. The company made glassware used at President Ronald Reagan's inaugural dinners in 1981. Because of high prices for natural gas and inexpensive imports, 1982 was a difficult year for glass makers.

=== 1990s ===
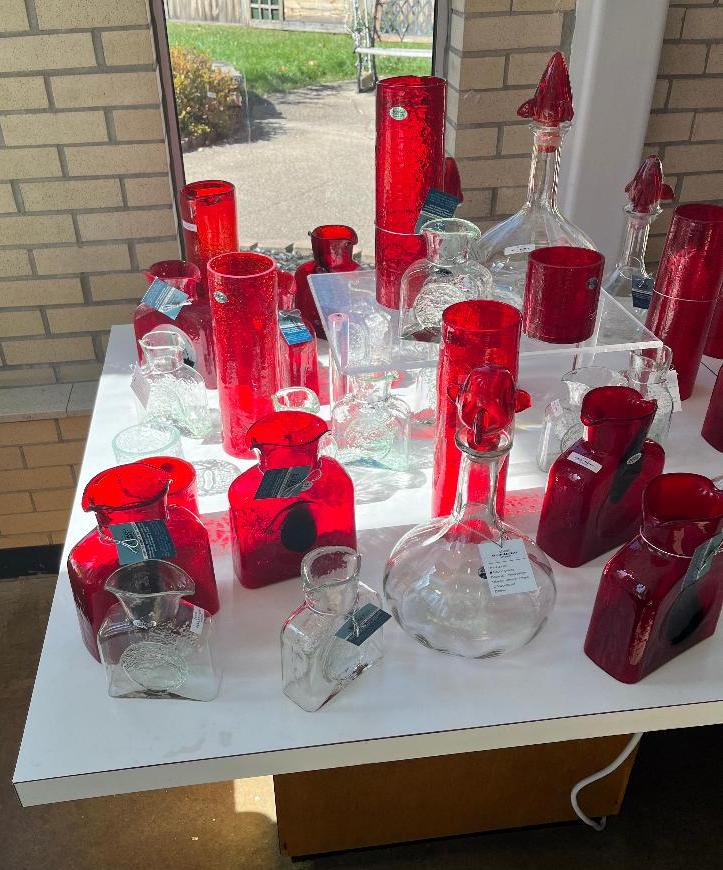
Blenko glassware

By 1990, Blenko was one of the few glass factories still operating in West Virginia. As of 1995, about 30 percent of Blenko's business was flat glass such as hand-blown window panes. The remaining 70 percent was glassware such as bottles, vases, and lamps. Blenko Glass Company employed about 130 workers. Blenko had produced the glass globes for lights at the United States Capitol, and was involved with replacement windows for the White House. Blenko glassware was sold at Bloomingdale's, Nordstrom, and Sharper Image.

Richard D. Blenko had joined the company in 1976, and he represented the fourth generation of the Blenko family. He became president of the company in 1996. He often promoted Blenko glassware by making appearances at retailers to interact with customers. He was also involved with documentary films about the company. Near the end of the century, a PBS documentary called "Hearts of Glass: The Story of Blenko Handcraft" was released that described William J. Blenko's quest to produce glass in the United States. Additional documentaries were produced, including "Blenko Retro: Three Designers of American Glass" (2001); and "Blenko - Spirit of American Stained Glass" (2005). Even more documentaries were produced more recently, such as "Blenko Glass: Behind the Scenes" (2012); "Blenko Glass: Creating Iowa Sunrise" (2015); and "Blenko Glass - The Collectors" (2020).

== 21st century ==
Water bottles in a variety of colors were still the company's most popular product. A problem for Blenko was that glassmaking in the United States had begun a gradual decline in the 1990s. In 2003, Dean Six, curator of the West Virginia Museum of American Glass, believed that it was not foreign competition that was causing financial problems for American glass factories. He said the problem was that people "weren't buying glass at all". He also said that plastic did not exist 100 years ago, and that people stopped having family meals after World War II.

=== Great Recession ===
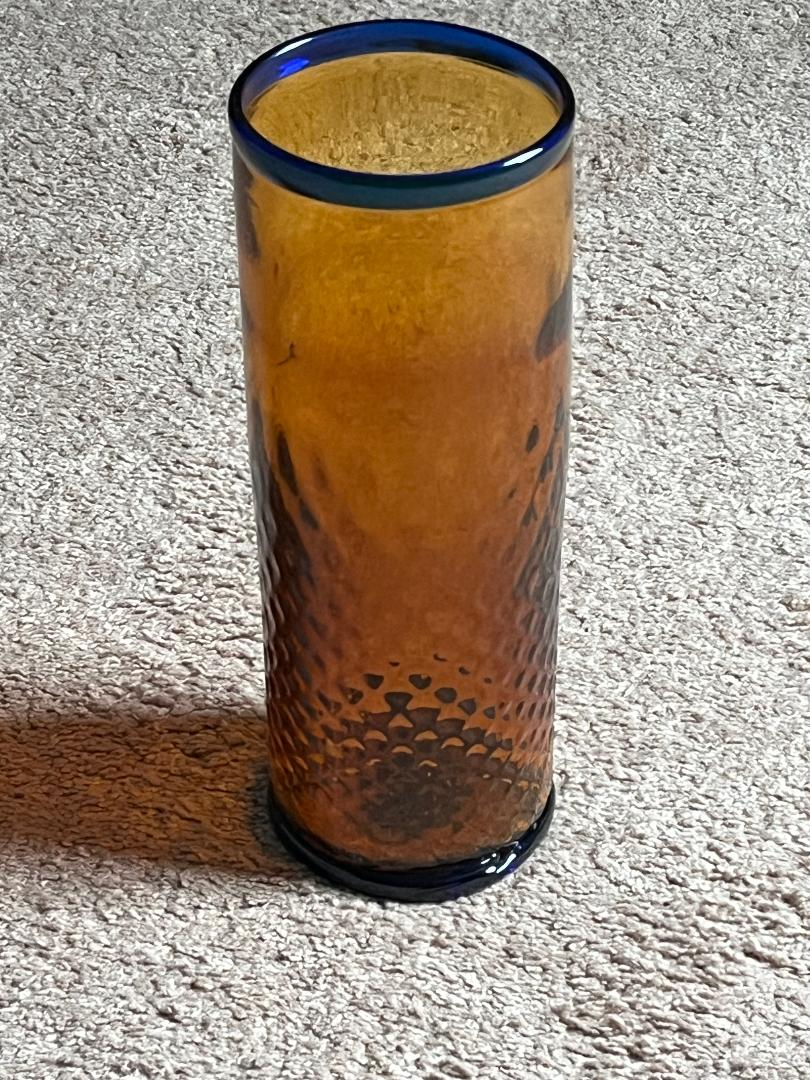
Blenko vase—a discretionary product

The Great Recession, beginning in December 2007 and ending in June 2009, accelerated the American glass industry's decline. In late September 2008, Blenko Glass Company changed its leadership. Company president Richard Blenko left the company and was replaced by Walter Blenko Jr. The reason given for the change was "changing market conditions". By January 2009, Blenko was considering bankruptcy, and it stopped producing glass on January 30. After the shutdown, orders increased and Blenko was able to resume glassmaking. By August, the company was providing employment to about 50 people.

Many of the products made by the art glass companies such as Blenko are discretionary instead of necessary, and discretionary spending is muted in a recession. On May 12, 2011, Blenko Glass Company filed for Chapter 11 bankruptcy protection, but the company still planned to continue producing and selling glass. By August 2012, the company's situation improved because of lower natural gas prices and a surge in sales. In December, a judge approved a reorganization plan. The company began a customer focus on middle- to high-income women between the ages of 30 and 50. It began using more social media and videos to promote its products. With its new focus, the company relied less on department stores, and more on internet sales and merchandisers that would sell Blenko glassware via the internet.

=== COVID and the Flatwoods Monster ===
Walter Blenko Jr., president of Blenko Glass Company, died on August 11, 2019—just a few months before the country began a struggle with the COVID pandemic of 2020 and the recession it caused. He was replaced by John W. Blenko, who had joined the company as vice president in 2016. The COVID-19 recession began in February as governments shutte businesses in an attempt to slow the spread of the disease, and it lasted until April of the same year. Although it was one of America's shortest recessions, it was also one of the deepest as Gross Domestic Product dropped 31.4 percent. Blenko Glass shut down for several months beginning in March. All 48 employees were laid off. In June, the company began to gradually reopen to produce glassware, and most of the workforce was hired back by August. The company was helped by a $250,000 (equivalent to $311,013 in 2025) loan from the federal government's Paycheck Protection Program.

Blenko Glass survived, and even prospered, in part because of a new product: a figurine of West Virginia's mythical Flatwoods monster. The product was 16.5 inches tall, and was colored clover green and ruby red. Production was limited to about 800 pieces, and the figurine was popular among millennials—a new market segment. The product was priced at $129 (equivalent to $160 in 2025), much higher than most of the company's other products. Sales of the Flatwoods monster enabled the company to have its most profitable year in two decades. By 2024, Blenko was still making glassware, and it had ten furnaces to make its glass.

=== Other collaborations ===
In 2003, Blenko Glass began crafting the "Appy Awards" for the Appalachian Film Festival held in Huntington, West Virginia. A total of 13 awards are presented: three each in the categories of student film, short film, feature film, and music video, along with one overall "Best in Festival" award.

== Selected products and designers ==
Blenko Glass Company has made numerous products. (Note: Links to two of the catalogs posted by Blenko (2002 and 2014–2015) are in the References section herein.) Several items are typically mentioned in books or newspaper articles. First, the company's stained glass was known worldwide for its use in cathedrals and churches. Second, the 384 Water Bottle is often mentioned and is usually the company's biggest seller. Third, since 1947 the company has hired designers to create unique glassware. Last, the company has produced limited-edition collectible glassware that honors the state of West Virginia.

=== Stained and flat glass ===
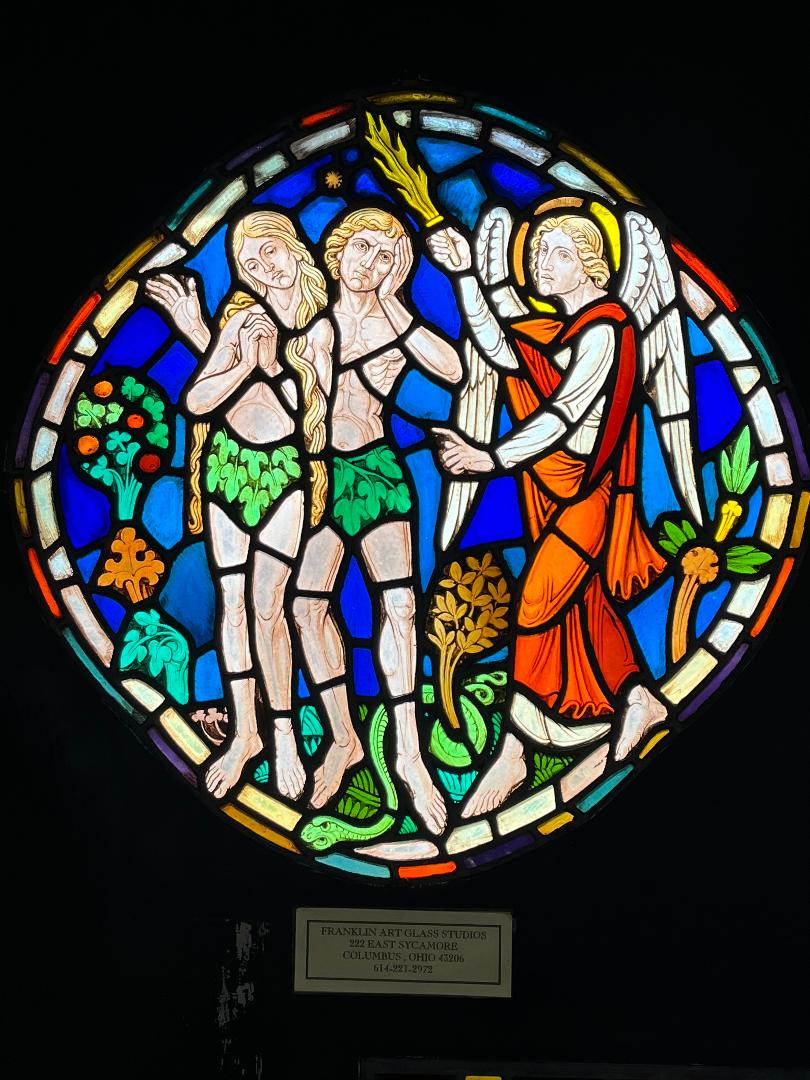
Stained glass window made by Franklin Art Glass Studios using Blenko glass

Blenko's flat glass was used by its customers to make stained glass windows. After World War I, Blenko glass (named Eureka at the time) was used to rebuild the Reims Cathedral in France. The Hall of Science at the 1939 New York World's Fair used Blenko glass. During the first three decades of the company's existence, Blenko stained glass was used at the Washington National Cathedral, Saint Patrick's Cathedral in New York, the Cathedral of St. John the Divine in New York, and the Duke University Chapel. By 1950 the Blenko glass factory was producing flat glass in about 1,000 different tints that was shipped all over the United States and Canada.

It was noted that in 1958 the Blenko glass works was the only one in the United States that produced hand blown church window glass. At least part of the glass used in the United States Air Force Academy Chapel, completed in 1962 in Colorado Springs, Colorado, was supplied by Blenko. Blenko stained glass was also used in secular places such as the Pro Football Hall of Fame in Canton, Ohio and Grant's Tomb. The process for making antique flat glass involved a glassblower blowing glass into a mold the shape of a cylinder. The cylinder's ends were cut off, then it was split lengthwise. Finally, it was reheated and flattened into a sheet of glass available in about 1,100 shades.

In 1992 Blenko Glass was selected to produce replacement window panes for the White House. To have the replacement windows look similar to the antique windows still in place, the White House needed a manufacturer that made window glass the old hand-blown way that was used to make the existing panes. Blenko was the only domestic manufacturer that still used the older method. At that time, the company was still producing flat glass blown to look antique, and it could create over 1,300 colors.

=== 384 Water Bottle ===
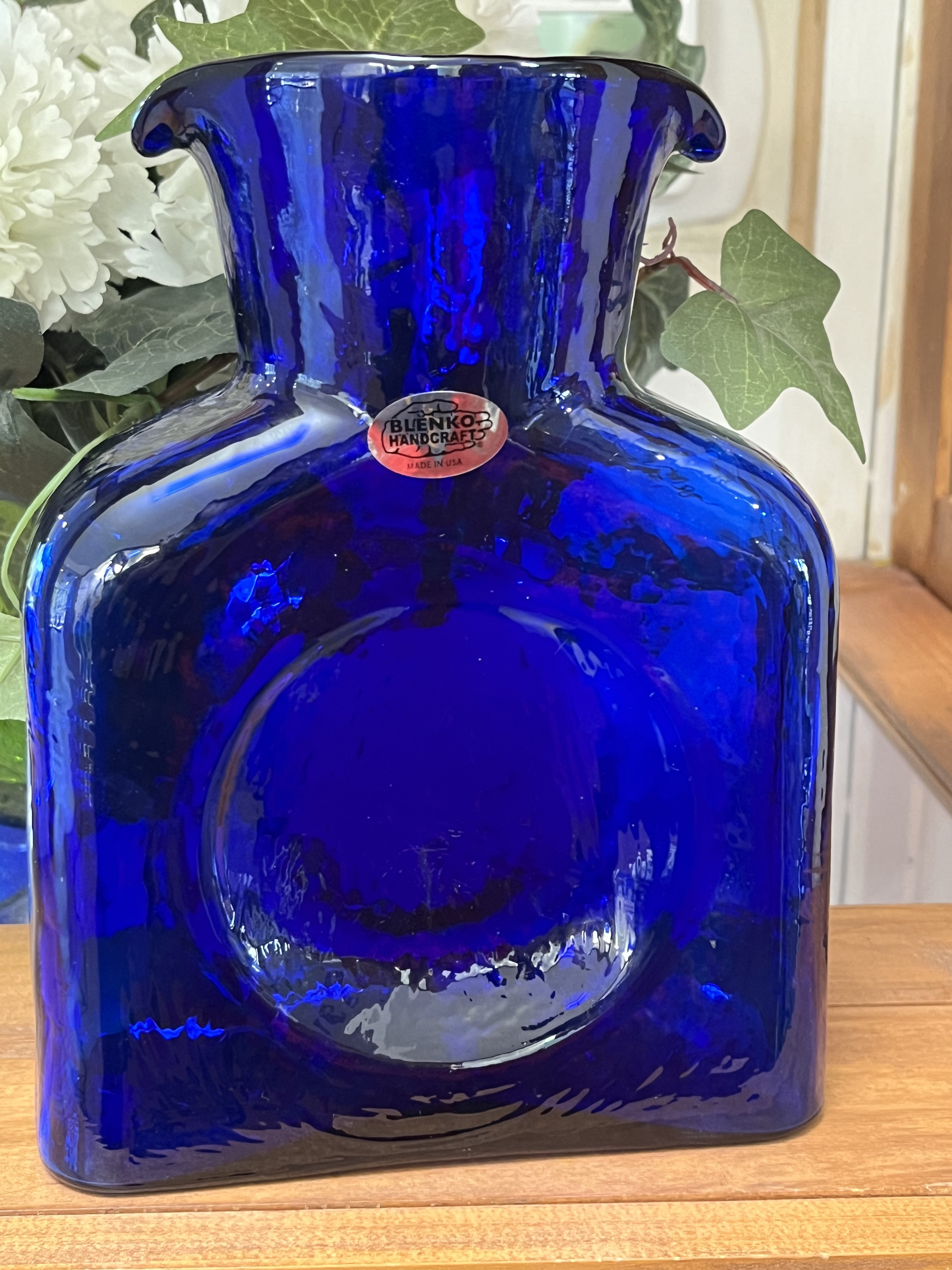
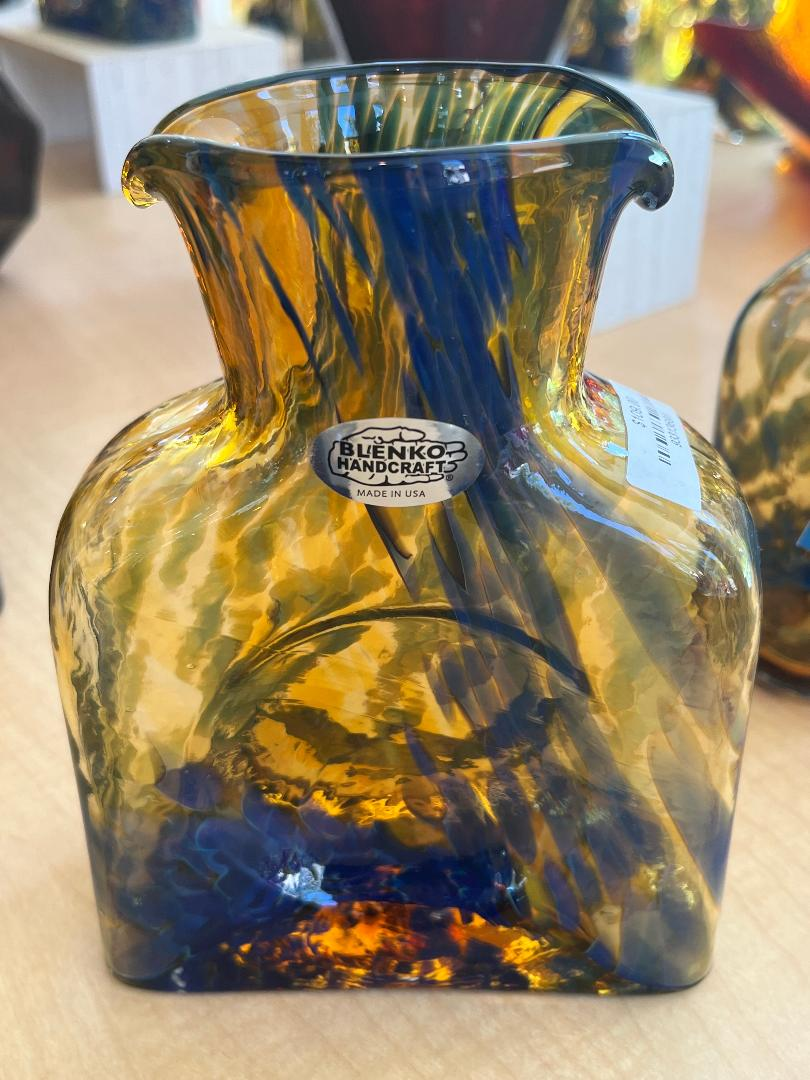
Blenko 384 Water Bottles

The Blenko 384 Water Bottle was first designed in 1938. The number "384" means that it was the fourth design during 1938. The bottle's narrow shape was designed to fit in the door of a somewhat new innovation: the "electric icebox" now known as a refrigerator. The bottle has two pouring spouts and an indentation in its center that makes it easy to hold. Often called the "iconic" 384 Water Bottle, it is the company's biggest seller.

Most of the molds used by Blenko are made of wood. The molds used for the 384 Water Bottle are metal because the high quantity produced would cause the company to need to replace a wooden water bottle mold every two days. The 384S Water Bottle, which has straight optic lines on the glass, was featured in the Holiday Gift Guide section of the December 2013 edition of Martha Stewart Living magazine.

=== Glassware designers ===
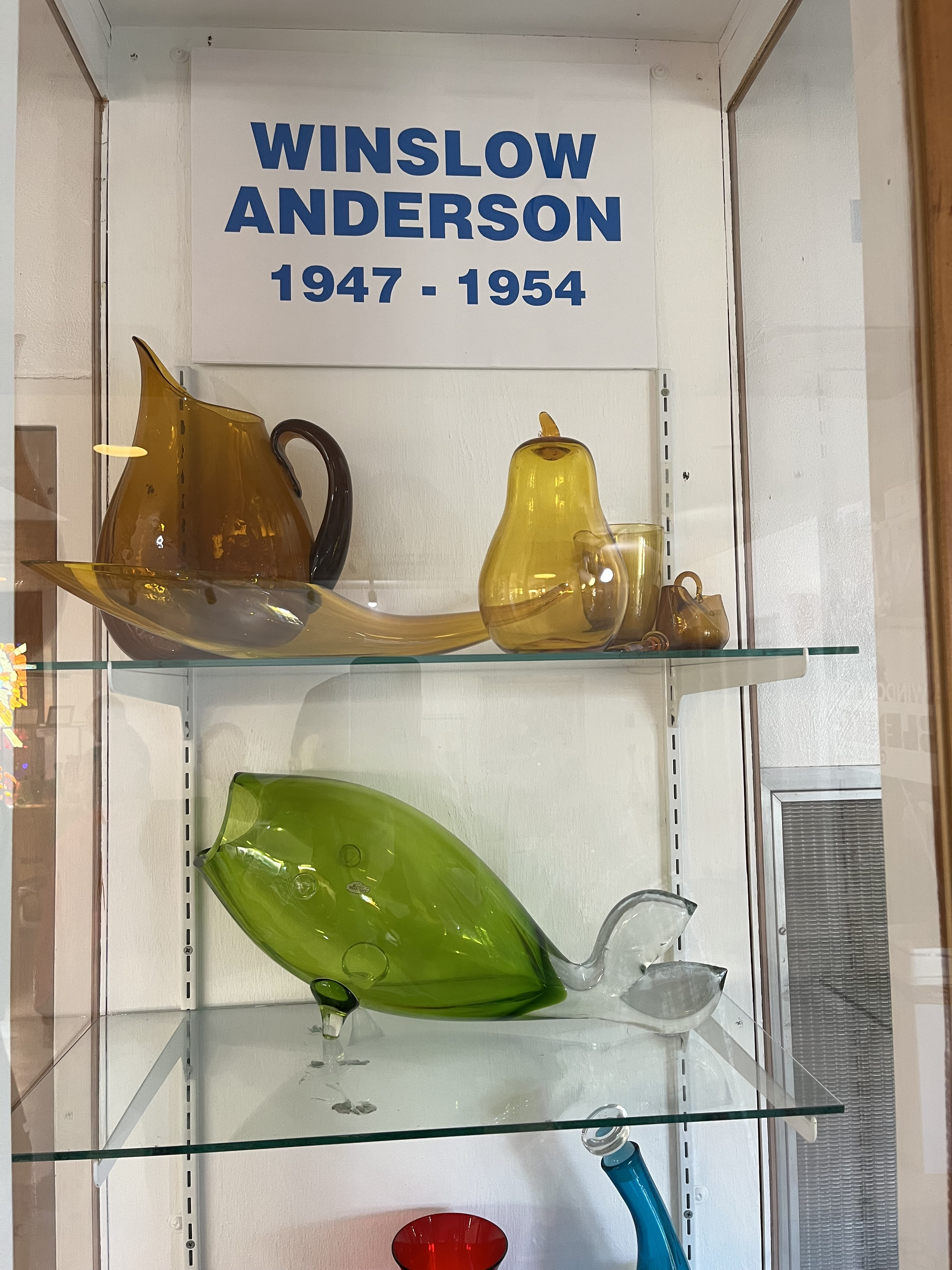
Winslow Anderson display

Blenko employed its first designer in 1947 when it hired ceramicist Winslow Anderson. Anderson helped the company establish a reputation with award–winning contemporary glassware. Anderson left Blenko for Lenox China around 1953. (Note: Winslow Anderson was speaking on the history of Blenko Glass in April 1953. In February 1954 a retailer was advertising Lenox china designed by Anderson.) The company's next designer was Wayne Husted, who further modernized the look of Blenko glassware. His decanters were colored flamboyantly, which set a trend for the company that continues.

Joel Philip Myers succeeded Husted as Blenko's director of design in 1963. By now the company had a reputation as one of the world's top art glass companies. Myers was unique in the United States because he was believed to be the only designer that blew his own glass. He designed about 40 items per year, and 2,000 to 3,000 copies of each design were produced. (Note: Lesley Jackson writes that Myers succeeded Husted as design director in 1964.) One collector considers Myers to be "Blenko's most famous and accomplished designer" and "one of the most exhibited and recognized glass artists in the world". In the early 1970s Meyers left the company to join the faculty at Illinois State University. (Note: Jackson writes that Meyers left Blenko in 1972. Crain wrote that Meyers worked for Blenko from 1964 to 1970 and part of 1971. A newspaper says that Joel Meyers joined the Illinois State University College of Fine Art faculty in September 1970 after leaving Blenko Glass Company.)

Other designers for Blenko were John Nickerson from 1972 to 1975, and Don Shepherd from 1975 to 1988. (Note: Crain wrote that Nickerson was hired in 1971.) Hank Murta Adams was designer from 1988 to 1994, and Matthew Carter from 1994 to 2002. Former designer Wayne Husted re-established a relationship with Blenko in 2001. One of his designs for 2002 was called Patriot, which was inspired after the events of September 11, 2001. The glassware pieces were hand-blown with red and blue glass. Another designer was Arlon Bayliss, who worked for nearly ten years for Blenko while also working as a professor of art and design at Anderson University. By 2016 he was in his tenth year of designing Blenko glassware that commemorates West Virginia Day. A team of two designers that began working with Blenko in late 2017 were Emma Walters and Andrew Shaffer, and they continued the relationship until March 2020. Designer and illustrator Liz Pavlovic partnered with the company in 2020 to create the limited edition Flatwoods monster glass piece. In 2024, Blenko worked with guest artist Don Pendleton, a graphic artist and West Virginia native. The company's creative director, James Arnett, designed the 2024 West Virginia Day art glass piece.

=== West Virginia Day ===
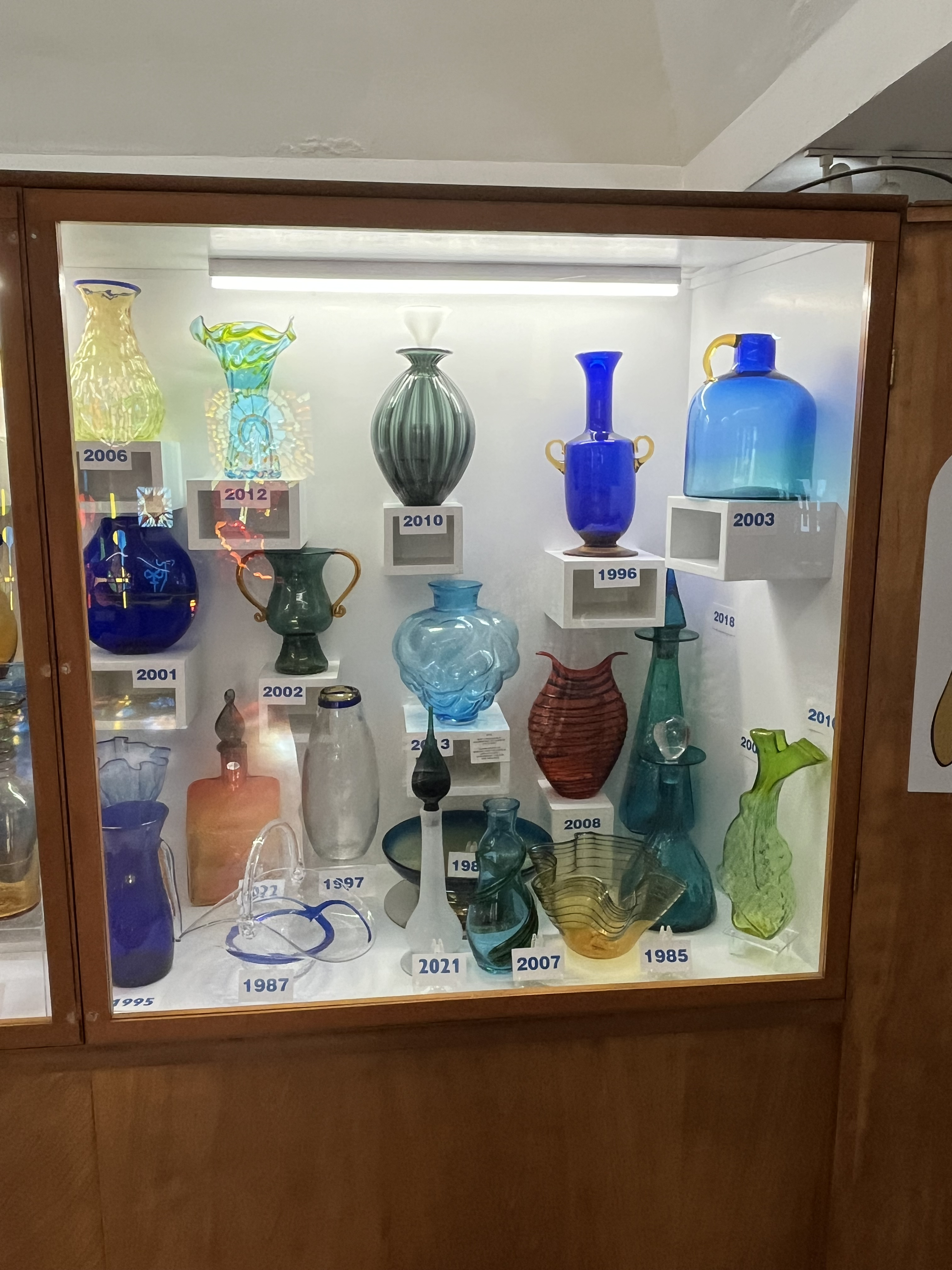
West Virginia Day pieces

Each year, Blenko Glass produces a limited-edition piece of glassware that becomes available around West Virginia Day. Production is limited to one for each year the state of West Virginia has existed. The tradition began in 1980. For 1980, West Virginia celebrated its 117th birthday, so Blenko produced 117 copies of a commemorative bowl. As an example, Blenko's 1995 design was a cobalt blue vase with clear handles, and it was sold at a Charleston department store. Customers lined up to make their purchase about 90 minutes before the store opened at 10:00 am. Because it was honoring the state's 132nd birthday, 132 pieces were produced.

Another example of the Blenko West Virginia Day piece is the 2016 version, which was called "Patience's Prize". It was a pale green vase that looked like a fish jumping into water. The vase honored West Virginia's outdoors and fishing. It was 14 inches tall and designed by Arlon Bayliss. Because West Virginia became 153 years old on June 20, 2016, only 153 copies of "Patience's Prize" were made. They were made available to the public on June 18, and could only be purchased at the company's visitor center. Purchases were limited to one per customer.

== See also ==
- List of museums in Huntington, West Virginia

== Notes ==
=== References ===
- Blenko Glass Company (2002). Blenko 2002 (catalog for 2002) (PDF). Milton, West Virginia: Blenko Glass Company.
- Blenko Glass Company (2015). Blenko 2014-2015 (catalog for 2014 & 2015) (PDF). Milton, West Virginia: Blenko Glass Company.
- Byrd, Robert C. (June 25, 1963). "Extension of remarks of Hon. Robert C. Byrd of West Virginia in the Senate of the United States - Tuesday, June 25, 1963". Congressional Record: Proceedings and Debates of the ... Congress. Washington, District of Columbia: Government Printing Office: A4043. OCLC 5058415.
- Casto, James E. (March 2017). "Blenko Changing How Its Colorful Glass is Sold". The State Journal. 33 (11). Charleston, West Virginia: 12. ProQuest 1882368134.
- Crain, Damon (April 2004). "Blenko – Uniquely American Modernist Glass". Journal of Antiques & Collectibles. V (2). Sturbridge, Massachusetts. Archived from the original on November 12, 2024.
- Crain, Damon (Fall 2007). "Blenko Glass: For Museums and the Masses". Modernism Magazine. 10 (3). Lambertville, New Jersey. Archived from the original on December 2, 2023.
- Daugherty, G.F., ed. (1924). Seventeenth Biennial Report of the Bureau of Labor of West Virginia 1923-1924. Charleston, West Virginia: State of West Virginia. OCLC 13484972.
- Flanagan, Joseph E., ed. (July 1917). "(Untitled)". The Ornamental Glass Bulletin of United States and Canada. 11 (6). Chicago, Illinois: National Ornamental Glass Manufacturers' Association of United States and Canada: 1. Archived from the original on October 7, 2024.
- Flanagan, Joseph E., ed. (January 1928). "Eureka's Antique Glass". The Bulletin of the Stained Glass Association of America. 22 (12). Chicago, Illinois: Stained Glass Association of America: 8–9.
- Fones-Wolf, Ken (2007). Glass Towns: Industry, Labor and Political Economy in Appalachia, 1890-1930s. Urbana, Illinois: University of Illinois Press. ISBN 978-0-25203-131-1. OCLC 69792081.
- Hammer, J.M., ed. (July 1920). "Classified Advertisements - Situations Wanted". The Glassworker. 39 (42). Pittsburgh, Pennsylvania: Commoner Publishing Company: 30. Archived from the original on October 7, 2024.
- Jackson, Lesley (2000). 20th Century Factory Glass. New York City: Rizzoli. ISBN 978-0-84782-253-9. OCLC 1369742032.
- Krak, J.B., ed. (January 1922). "News of the Trade". The Glass Industry. 3 (1). New York, New York: Glass Industry Publishing Company: 23–24. OCLC 1751261. Archived from the original on October 7, 2024.
- Peelle Jr, William A., ed. (1894). State of Indiana - Fifth Biennial Report (Eleventh Volume) of the Department of Statistics for 1893-1894. Indianapolis, Indiana: William B. Burford. ISBN 978-1-33290-560-7.
- Shotwell, David J. (2002). Glass A to Z. Iola, Wisconsin: Krause Publications. ISBN 978-0-87349-385-7. OCLC 440702171.
- Unknown (Fall 1989). "In Memoriam - Marion Hunt Blenko". Stained Glass Quarterly. 84 (3). The Stained Glass Association of America: 180.
- Venable, Charles L.; Denker, Ellen P.; Grier, Katherine C.; Harrison, Stephen G. (2000). China and Glass in America, 1880-1980: from Tabletop to TV Tray. Dallas, Texas: Dallas Museum of Art. ISBN 978-0-81096-692-5. OCLC 42960630.
