= Arlon Bayliss =

Visual artist and professor emeritus

Arlon Bayliss (born 1957, in Warwickshire, England) is a visual artist, glass sculptor, and emeritus professor of art at Anderson University, known for his monumental public art installations in Indiana, as well as for his studio glass and factory art glass represented in European art museum collections. Bayliss has designed glass art series for companies such as Rosenthal, Steuben, Blenko and EOS Murano.

== Education ==
Bayliss obtained a Bachelor of Arts degree in ceramics from Bristol Polytechnic (now UWE) in 1978. He then received a Master of Arts in Glassmaking at the Royal College of Art in 1981. His education continued by studying and working at Lobmeyr and Co. in Vienna, the Leerdam Factory in Amsterdam, Rosenthal GmbH in Germany, Isle of Wight Glass in England, and Steuben Glass in Corning, NY.

== Career and achievements ==
In 1990 Bayliss moved to the US to establish the glass program at Anderson University, where he was promoted to emeritus professor of art in 2014. Alongside academic duties, Bayliss has also kept a private professional practice, allowing him to design and develop a series of sponsored public artworks, as well as to design studio glass art pieces and collections for renowned Venetian glass and decorative glassmaking enterprises. Distinctions received by the artist include the 2017 Honor Award for Monumental Public Art from the Arts Council of Indianapolis.

=== Studio glass and factory art glass ===
In 2007 Bayliss started an eight-year engagement as a design director for Blenko Glass Company in West Virginia In 2016, Bayliss's art designs for Blenko were exhibited at the Beaney House of Art and Knowledge, Canterbury, as part of the West Virginia University art collection. Bayliss's studio glass is included in collections found in specialized museums, among them the Musée des Arts Decoratifs, in Lausanne, Switzerland. the National Museum of Scotland,

=== Public art installations ===
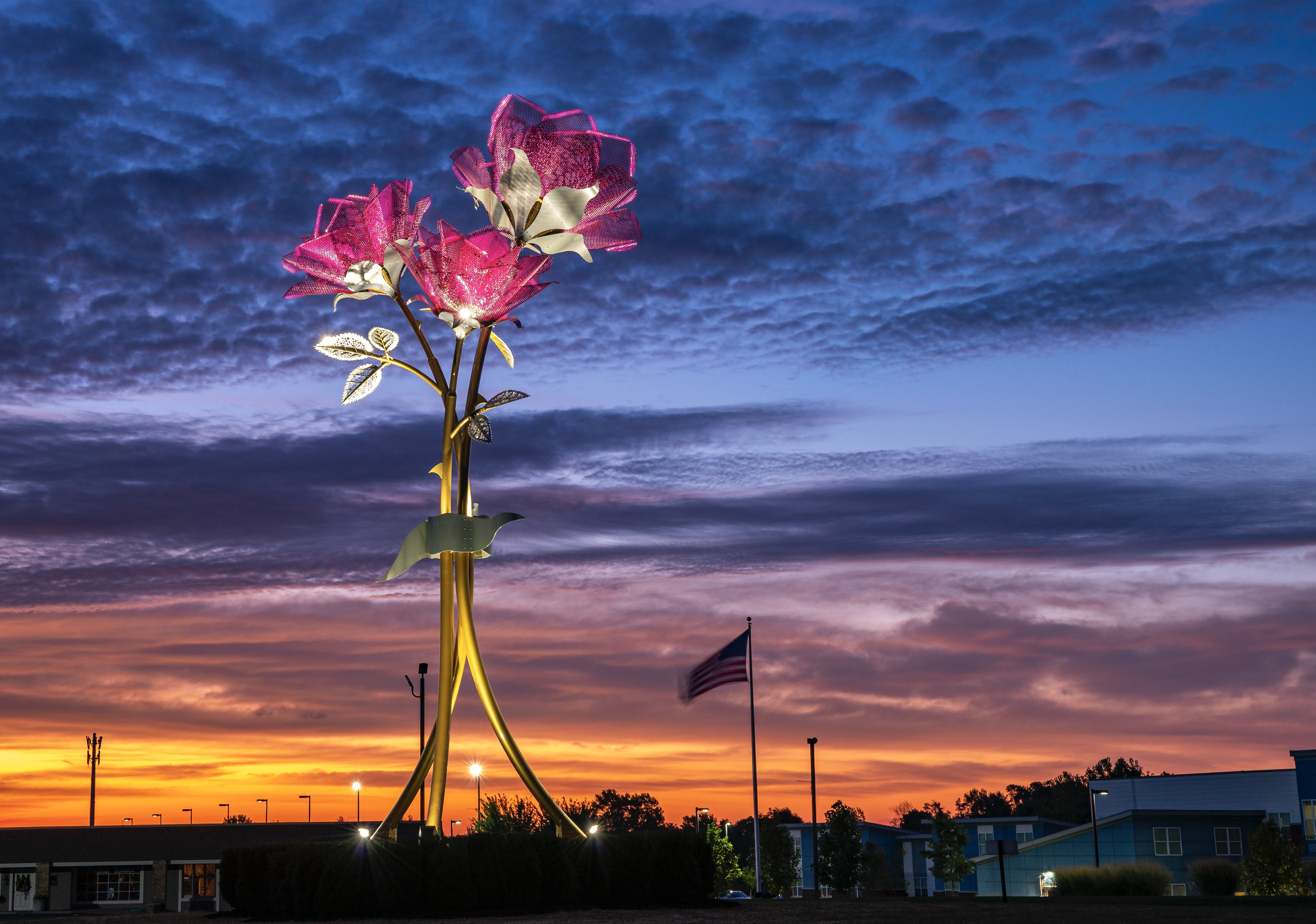
"Grace, Love and Joy" - Steel and light sculpture, height 45 ft (14 m), by Arlon Bayliss

Bayliss's large public art started in 1993 with the inauguration of Helios, a sculpture made up of glass sheets arranged as a double helix, which stands at the center of a fountain outside the Anderson University campus' main science building. This was followed (1996–2001) by the development of the Crystal Arch project, a steel framework (17-feet tall / 36-feet long) carrying hundreds of multi-faceted, multi-colored crystals. This monument was designed by Bayliss jointly with teaching colleague Jason Knapp to celebrate the city's cultural heritage and diversity and stands today in public display at Anderson City Hall after refurbishing in 2011.

Other publicly exhibited glass-made, large sculptures designed and built by Bayliss -often in collaboration with partners- include the following:

- Light, Words, Life (2007), made in collaboration with Joyce Brinkman, Indiana Poet Laureate 2002–2008, for the Indianapolis Central Library,
- Flight Wave (2008), a three-dimensional composition of multicolored reflective chevrons "flying" on a clear glass wall made in collaboration with his wife Mary Jo Bayliss, for the Indianapolis International Airport,
- Between Infinite Stars (2012), comprising three suspended illuminated clouds floating in a large ceiling void at the Indianapolis Hebrew Congregation quarters,
- Seeds of Light (2016), made with students'and community participation for a pocket park facing the entrance of the Indianapolis Motor Speedway in Speedway, Indiana,
- Beacon Bloom (2017), a 36-foot tall, outdoor public art sculpture representing a bouquet of flowers in the City of Carmel, Indiana,
- Kawaakari: River of Light (2019), a four hundred-foot-long suspended sculpture floating high above the Indianapolis Circle Centre Dining Pavilion, completed in 2019, and
- Homage to Hoagy is a sculptural project installed in 2020 in a roundabout across from the Palladium.
