= Appalachian Film Festival =

Film Festival in Huntington, West Virginia, U.S.

- Location: Huntington, West Virginia
- Founded: 2003; 22 years ago
- Awards: APPYs
- Hosted by: Foundry Theatre
- Festival date: Last weekend in April
- Website: Official website

The Appalachian Film Festival is an annual film festival established in 2003 and based in Huntington, West Virginia. The festival aims at promoting local Appalachian culture, while also only selecting films within the Appalachian region.

== Awards ==
The Appalachian Film Festival presents 13 awards, known as "APPYs," which include three honors in each category and a single "Best of Festival" award. Each APPY is a handcrafted blown glass apple created by Blenko Glass.

=== Categories ===
- Student
- Music Videos
- Short Films
- Feature Films

== Alumni ==
- 2004 - Burning Annie
- 2011 - Winter's Bone
- 2012 - The Last Ride
- 2023 - King Coal
