= West Virginia Day =

State holiday in West Virginia, U.S.

- Observed by: West Virginia
- Date: June 20
- Next time: June 20, 2026
- Frequency: annual

Flag of West Virginia

West Virginia Day is a state holiday in the US state of West Virginia. Celebrated annually on June 20, the day celebrates the state's 1863 admission to the Union as a result of the secession of several northwestern counties of Virginia during the American Civil War. It is mostly celebrated through festivals in major West Virginian cities.

== History ==
During the Civil War, the Virginia General Assembly in Richmond chose to join the Confederate States of America, much to the chagrin of many Union loyalists in the counties bordering Pennsylvania and Ohio in the trans-Allegheny region of the state. They created a Unionist state government in Wheeling under Francis Pierpont, which began to call for the creation of a new Union state in western Virginia, but the inclusion of many Confederate counties in the new state complicated their efforts. After two years of legal maneuvering, West Virginia was formally admitted to the United States of America on June 20, 1863 via proclamation by President Abraham Lincoln.

June 20 had been informally celebrated across West Virginia over the next six decades until the West Virginia Legislature gave the holiday formal recognition in 1927. The day has traditionally been celebrated with festivities at the state capitol complex in Charleston and at other locations across the state. West Virginia Day is celebrated in various different ways across the state, with things like festivals at the capitol in Charleston and Fayetteville.
