= Chance's Glassworks =

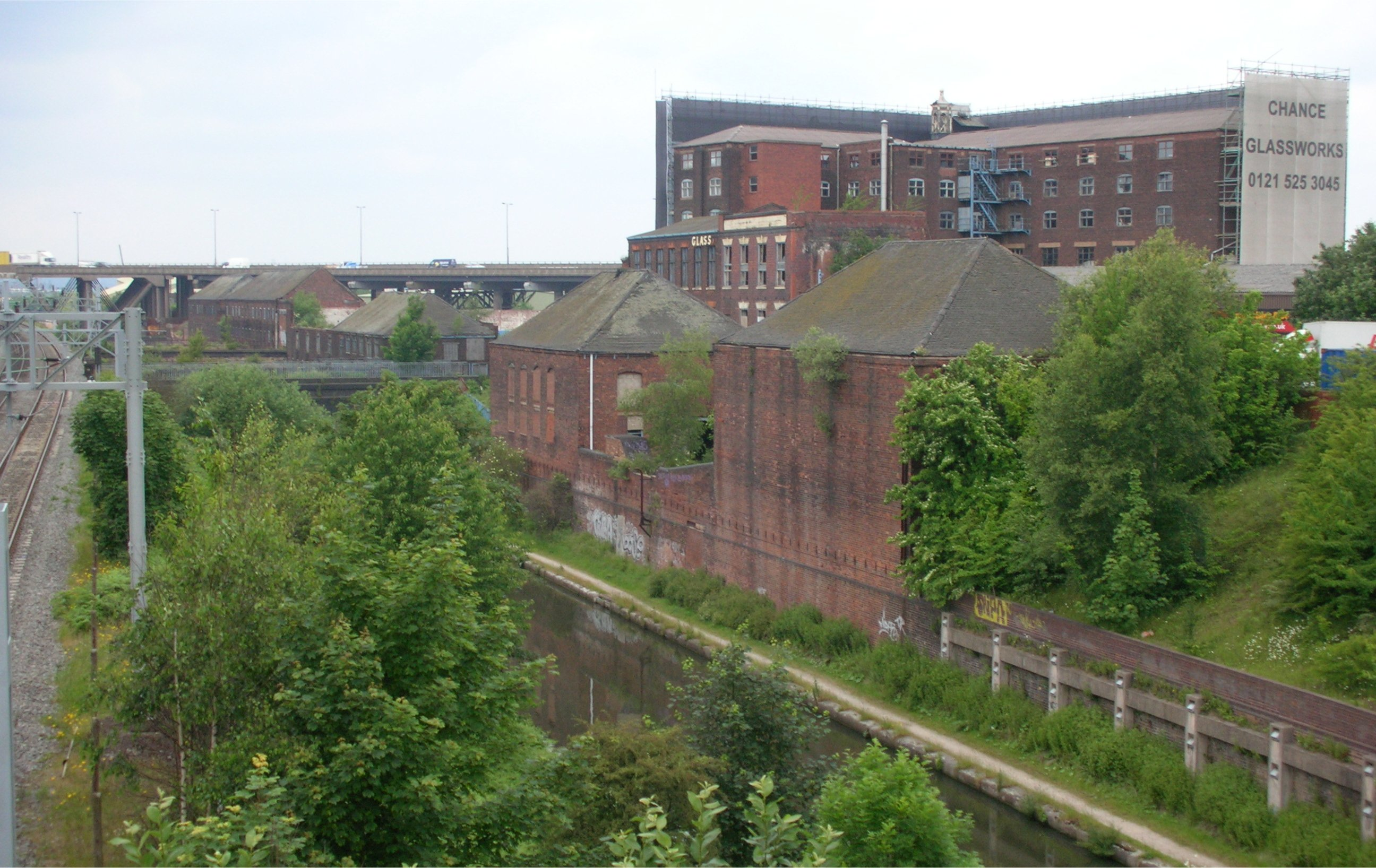
- Seven-storey warehouse and canalside buildings of Chance's Glassworks, in 2007
- Interactive map of the Chance's Glassworks area

General information
- Location: Smethwick, England
- Coordinates: 52°30′20″N 1°59′36″W grid reference SP 00546 89759
- Closed: 1981

Chance's Glassworks is a former industrial site in Smethwick, West Midlands, England, established in 1822, where glass was manufactured by the Chance Brothers. Production ended in 1981. It is situated next to the BCN New Main Line canal, and a short distance south of the M5 motorway.

== History ==
Robert Lucas Chance bought the site in 1822. By the 1830s the site occupied 14 acres (5.7 ha), and in the 1850s there were the seven-storey warehouse and office building, and eight buildings for glass production. Other buildings known to be on the site included worker's cottages, and buildings for particular functions including a carpenter's shop and a smith's shop.

Production by the company included glass for about 2,300 lighthouses, and glass for the Crystal Palace and the Houses of Parliament.

The company was taken over by Pilkington in the 1950s. Glass manufacturing ceased in 1981, and the site has been unused since then.

== Scheduled monument and listed buildings ==
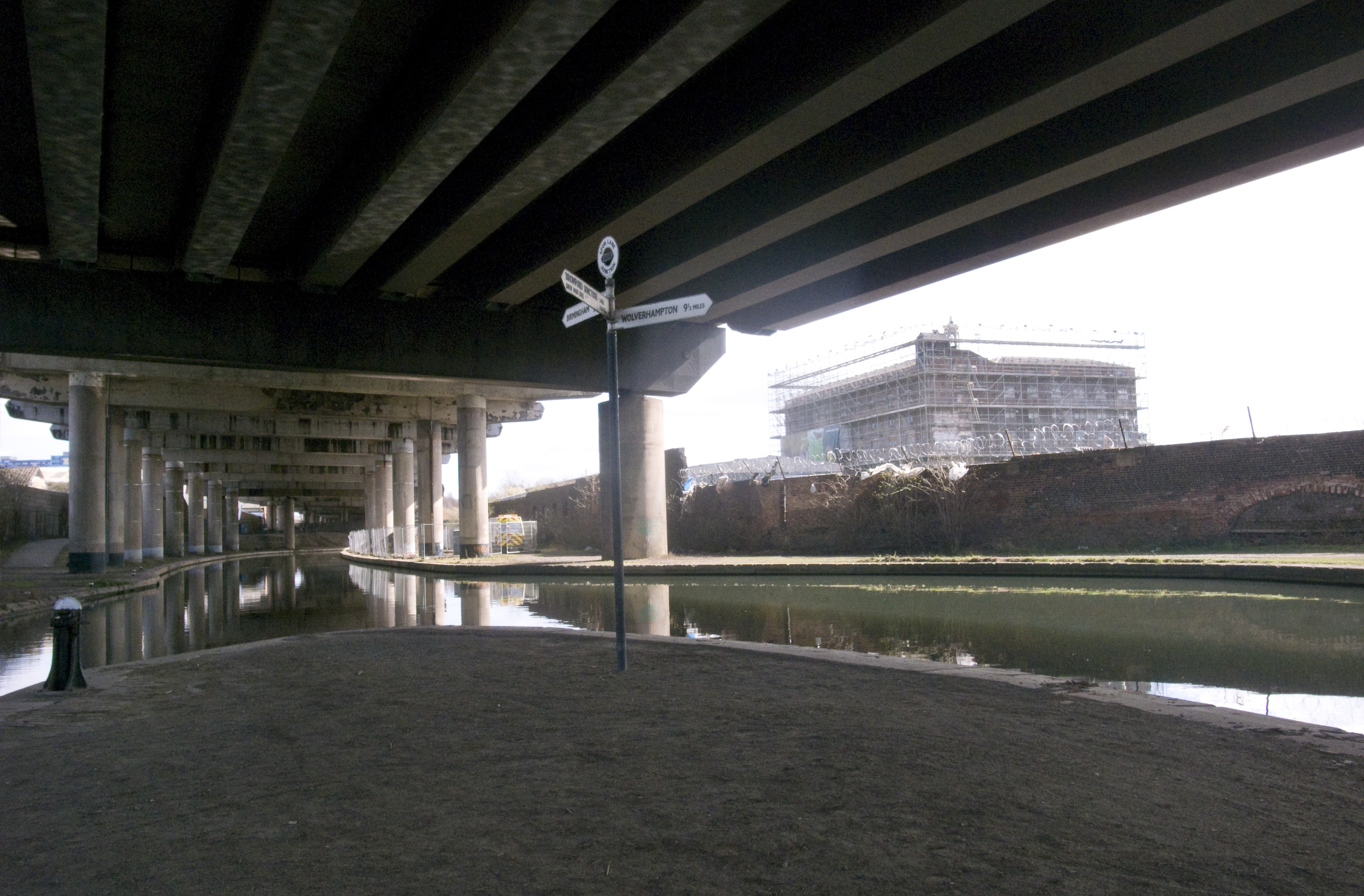
The seven-storey warehouse seen from beneath the M5 motorway at Spon Lane Junction

The site was declared a scheduled monument in 2005. It is within the Smethwick Summit/Galton Valley Conservation Area, between the Old Main Line Canal to the north, and the New Main Line Canal to the south.

Within the area of the scheduled monument are several listed buildings, excluded from the scheduling. There are the seven-storey L-plan warehouse and adjacent three-storey offices on Palace Drive, built in 1847; warehouses alongside the canal, built between 1840 and 1852; and two road bridges and a railway bridge across the canal, constructed about the same period. All these buildings were listed Grade II in 1978.

Apart from the listed buildings, the site has been levelled; some buried structures, including furnace bases, tunnels and gas flues, were discovered during a survey in 1984.

A survey requested by Chances Heritage Trust, using ground-penetrating radar, was carried out in March 2022. Surveying an accessible area of 0.7 hectares (1.7 acres), an image of the surviving regenerative furnace No. 7 was made.

== Heritage at Risk, and the Heritage Trust ==
Chance's Glassworks is on Historic England's Heritage at Risk Register. It appeared on the Victorian Society's top ten endangered buildings in 2024.

The Chance Glassworks Heritage Trust was formed in March 2015, with the aim of restoring the existing buildings on the site, and advancing education concerning the social, economic and architectural history and heritage of the buildings and the area. When restored, space would be let within the buildings, to create business training and re-training opportunities.
