= James Timmins Chance =

Glass manufacturer and lighthouse engineer (1814–1902)

Sir James Timmins Chance Bt
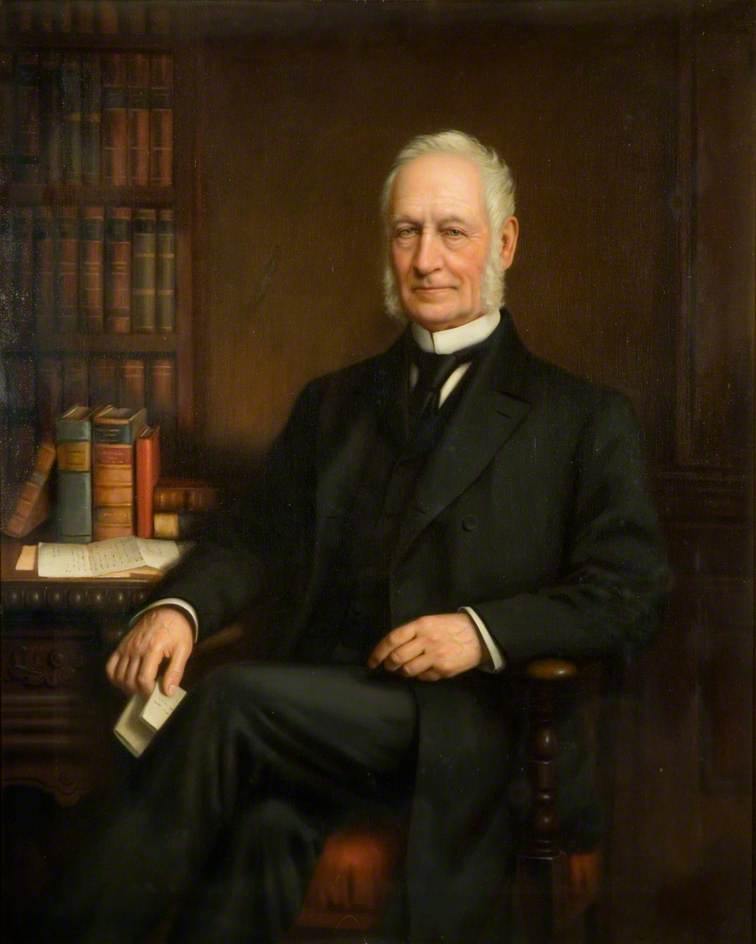
- Chance in 1902 (possibly painted posthumously)
- Born: 22 March 1814; Birmingham, England
- Died: 6 January 1902 (aged 87); Hove, Sussex, England
- Monuments: In West Smethwick Park
- Education: London University; Trinity College, Cambridge
- Occupation: Industrialist
- Organization: Chance Brothers
- Known for: Philanthropy

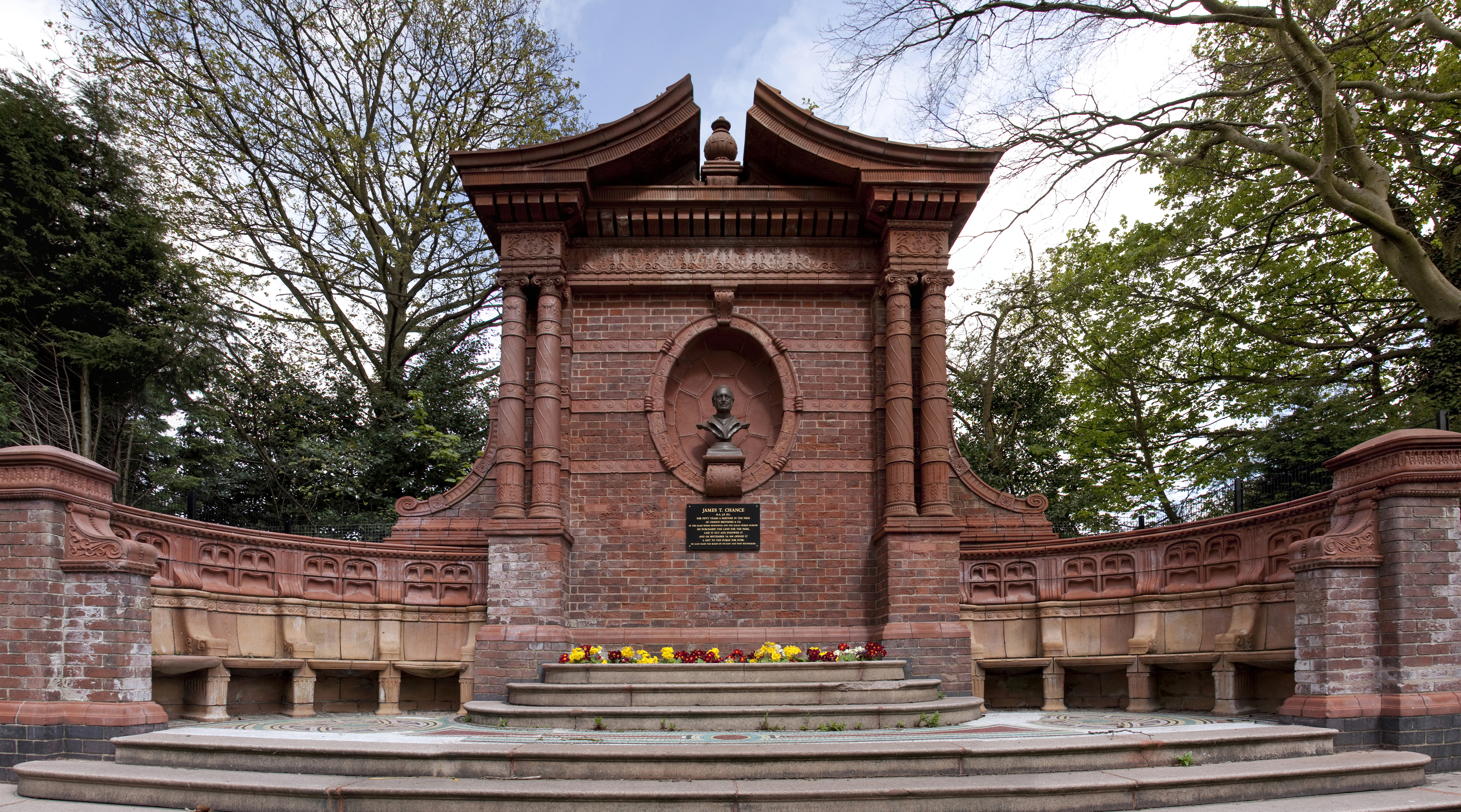
Memorial in West Smethwick Park

Sir James Timmins Chance, 1st Baronet (22 March 1814 – 6 January 1902) was an English industrialist, philanthropist, director of the London and North Western Railway, and an expert in lighthouse optics. He served in public office, including as a Justice of the Peace for Staffordshire and Worcestershire in 1851, Deputy Lieutenant of Staffordshire in 1856 and for Worcestershire in 1859 (in which time he set up the first Volunteer Rifle Corps in the country), and High Sheriff of Staffordshire in 1868.

== Biography ==
He was a nephew of Lucas Chance, the founder of the family firm, glassmakers, Chance Brothers, of which James was, like his father, also William, a partner and eventually head, until his retirement in 1889, when the company was formed into a public company and the name changed to Chance Brothers & Co. Ltd.

He was educated at London University, then Trinity College, Cambridge.

He gave West Smethwick Park to the public in 1895, and donated £50,000 to the endowment fund of Birmingham University in 1900. The park includes a memorial to him, in brick and terracotta, with a bronze bust by Hamo Thornycroft. Beneath the bust is a plaque reading:

James T. Chance
M.A J.P. D.L.
For fifty years a partner in the firm
of Chance Brothers & Co.
at the Glass Works Smethwick
and the Alkali Works, Oldbury
He purchased the land for the park,
laid it out and endowed it
and on September 7th 1895 opened it
A gift to the public for ever.
He also made the roads on its East and West boundaries.

He was awarded a Baronetcy in 1900, to which he was succeeded by his son, Sir William Chance, 2nd Baronet (1853–1935).

He sat for a portrait by John Callcott Horsley in 1851. Another, by Joseph Gibbs, may have been painted posthumously. It was presented to Smethwick Borough Council in December 1902, eleven months after the subject's death. It is now in Wednesbury Museum and Art Gallery.

== Bibliography ==
- On Optical Apparatus Used in Lighthouses. 1867.

Baronetage of the United Kingdom
New creation	Baronet (of Grand Avenue); 1900–1902	Succeeded by William Chance
