= Kilvert =

The surname (or family name) Kilvert may refer to:

- Francis Kilvert (1840–1879), English clergyman and diarist
- Francis Edwin Kilvert (1838–1910), lawyer and mayor of Hamilton, Ontario
- Ian Scott-Kilvert (1917–1989), British editor and translator
- John Ashley Kilvert (1833–1920), English soldier, Mayor of Wednesbury, who survived the Charge of the Light Brigade
- Lilly Kilvert (born 1953), American production designer
