= Chance Brothers =

Former glass manufacturers in Smethwick, England

Coordinates: 52°30′22″N 1°59′35″W

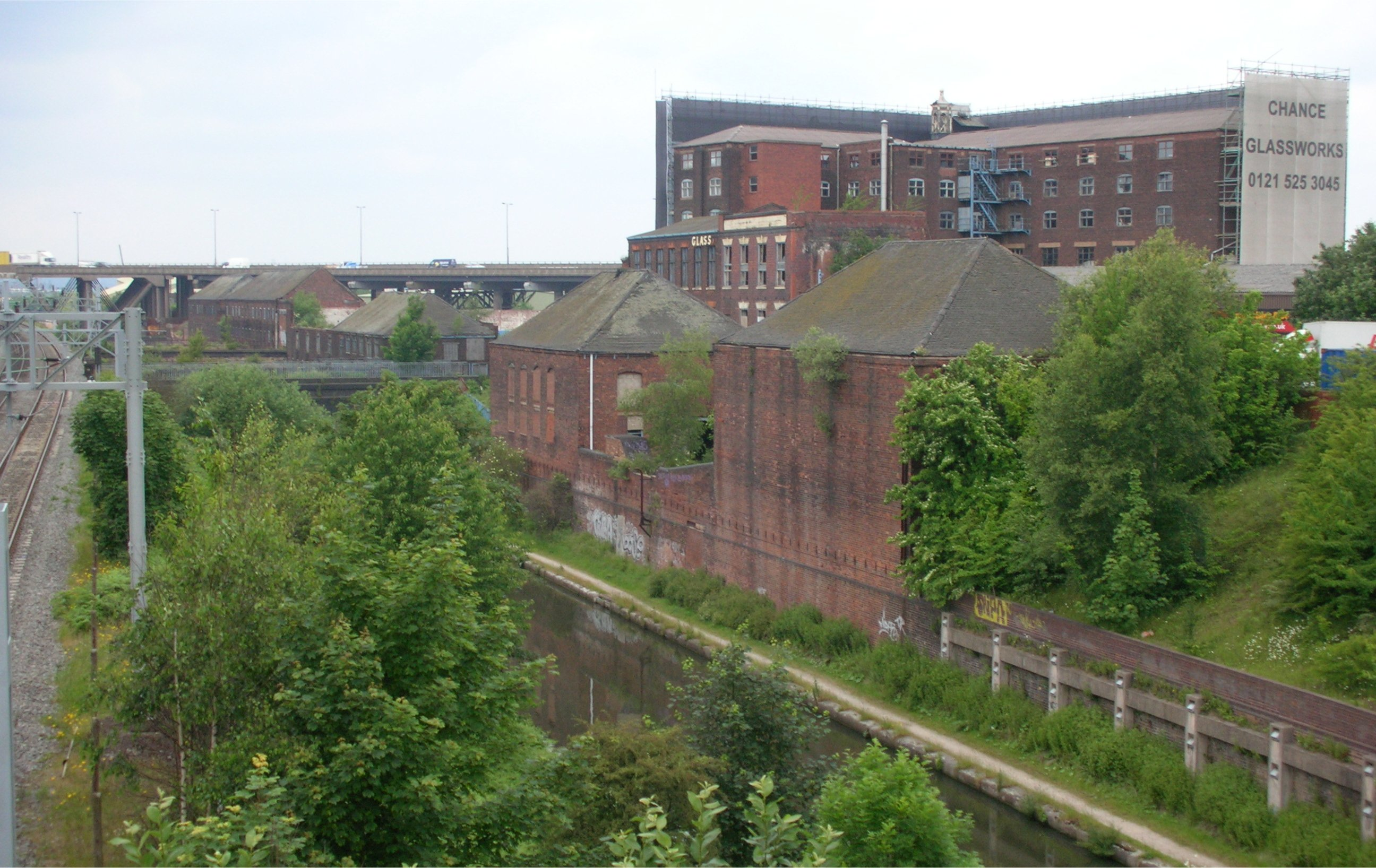
Chance's Glassworks, Spon Lane, Smethwick

Chance Brothers and Company was an English glassworks originally based in Spon Lane, Smethwick, West Midlands (formerly Staffordshire). It was a leading glass manufacturer and a pioneer of British glassmaking technology.

The Chance family originated in Bromsgrove, Worcestershire, as farmers and artisans before setting up business in Smethwick in 1822. Situated between Birmingham and the Black Country in the agglomeration of the Midlands industrial heartland, they took advantage of skilled workers, canals, and the many advances taking place in the industrial West Midlands at the time.

Throughout its almost two centuries of history, many changes affected the company, which, now in private ownership, continues to operate as Chance Glass Limited, a specialized industrial glass manufacturer in Malvern, Worcestershire, at one of its small subsidiary factories. The company's social and economic impact on the region is the subject of a project sponsored by the Heritage Lottery Fund.

== History ==
=== 19th century ===
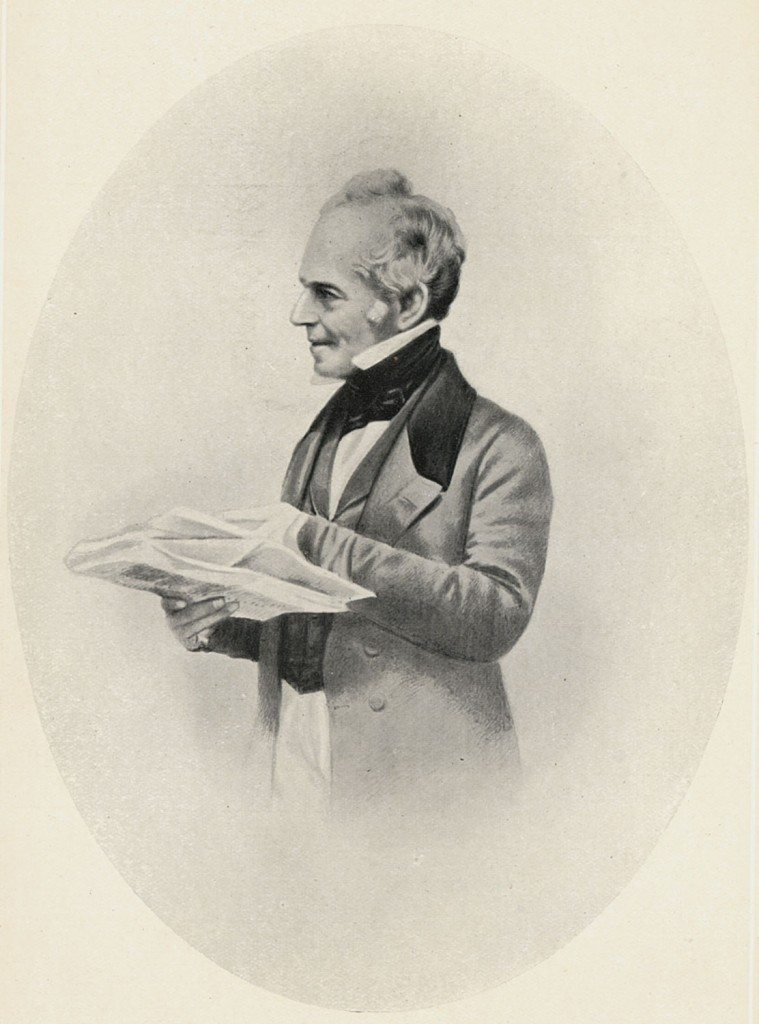
Robert Lucas Chance – from a photograph

Robert Lucas Chance (8 October 1782 – 7 March 1865), known as 'Lucas', bought the British Crown Glass Company's works in Spon Lane in November 1822. The company specialised in making crown window glass. The company ran into difficulty, and its survival was secured in 1832 by investment from Chance's brother, William (29 August 1788 – 8 February 1856), who owned an iron-forging business in Great Charles Street, Birmingham. After the partnership with the Hartley Brothers was dissolved in 1836, Lucas and William Chance became partners in the business, which was renamed Chance Brothers and Company.

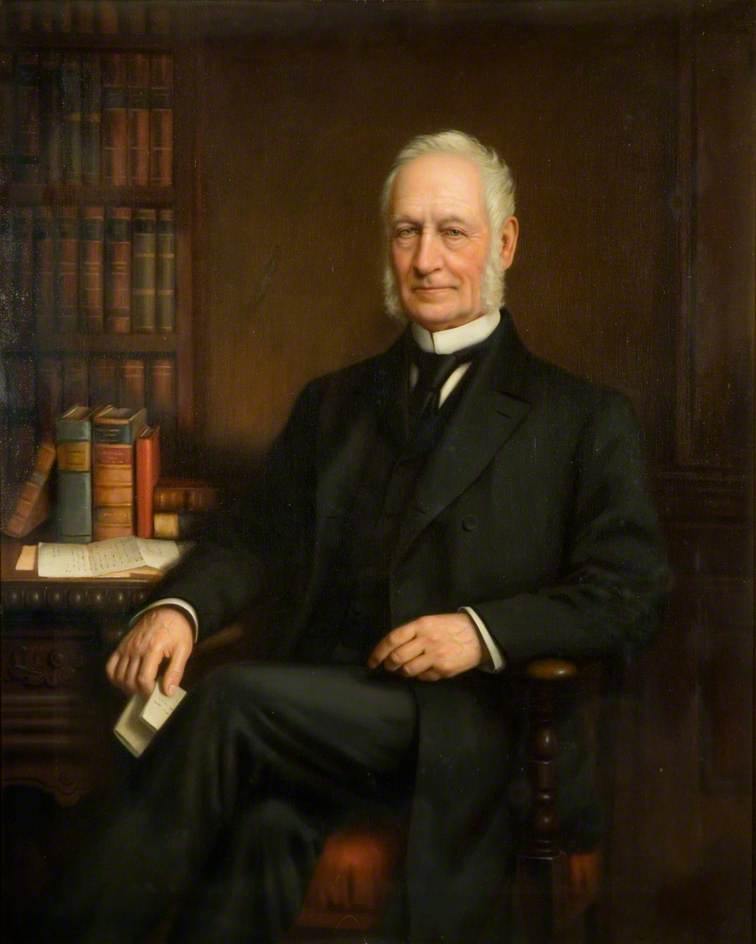
Portrait of Sir James Timmins Chance, by Joseph Gibbs, 1902 (possibly painted posthumously)

Chance Brothers was among the earliest glassworks to carry out the cylinder process in Europe, and the company became known as "... the greatest glass manufacturer in Britain." In 1832, it made the first British cylinder blown sheet glass using French and Belgian workers. In 1839, James Timmins Chance patented a new process to grind the surfaces of plate glass. In 1848, under the supervision of Georges Bontemps, a French glassmaker from Choisy-le-Roi, who had purchased the secret of the stirrer after the deaths of Pierre Louis Guinand and Joseph von Fraunhofer, the pioneers of the manufacture of high-precision lenses for observatory telescopes, a new plant was set up to manufacture crown and flint glass for lighthouse optics, telescopes and cameras. Bontemps agreed to share the secret with Chance Brothers and stayed in England for six years to collaborate with them. Only three other companies in Britain made glass in the same way: Pilkington of St Helens, Hartleys of Sunderland, and Cooksons of Newcastle. In 1832, Chance Brothers became the first company to adopt the cylinder method to produce sheet glass, and became the largest British manufacturer of window and plate glass, and optical glass.

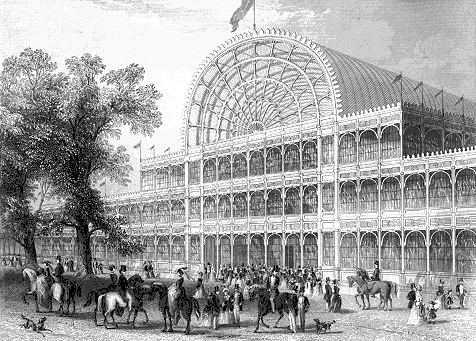
The transept façade of The Crystal Palace in Hyde Park, London

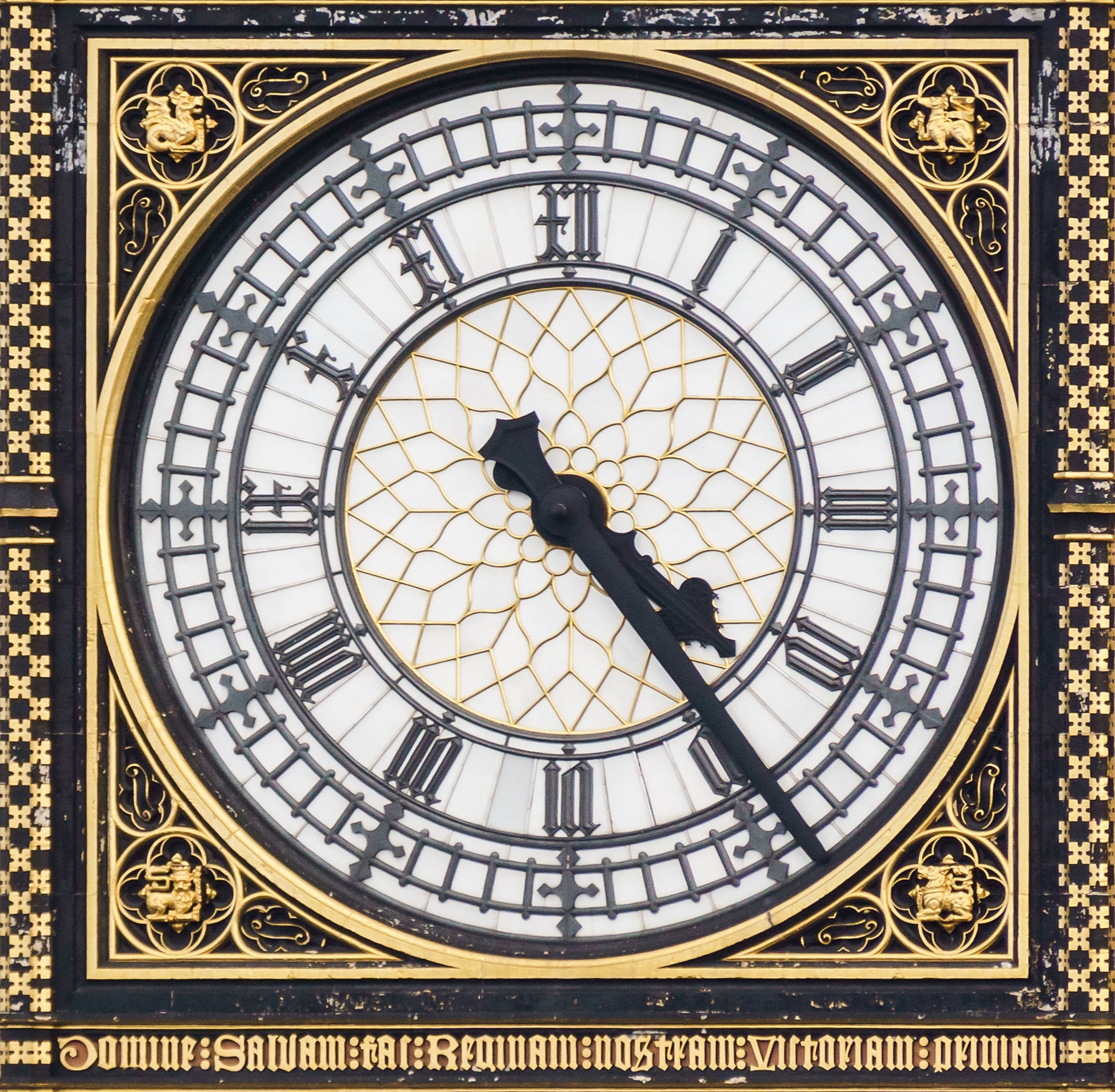
One of the dials of the Great Clock of Westminster, popularly known as Big Ben. (The minute hand is 14 feet (4.3 m) long.)

Other Chance Brothers projects included glazing the Crystal Palace to house the Great Exhibition of 1851, and the Houses of Parliament (built 1840–1860). At that time, it was the only firm able to make the opal glass for the four faces of the Westminster Clock Tower, which houses the famous bell, Big Ben. The ornamental windows for the White House in America were also made there. Other products included stained glass windows, ornamental lamp shades, microscope glass slides, painted glassware, glass tubing and specialist types of glass.

They made a 24-inch (62 cm) flint glass lens for the Craig telescope. The French lens craftsman George Bontemps helped on the project, which for its day was a very large lens. They made only part of the lens, a doublet; Thames Plate Glass Company made the other part.

In 1870, Chance Brothers took over the failing Nailsea Glassworks in Somerset, but problems with coal supply led to the closure of that business.

Elihu Burritt (1810–1879), the American philanthropist and social activist, once said about Chance, "In no other establishment in the world can one get such a full idea of the infinite uses which glass is made to serve as in these immense works."

In 1900, a baronetcy was created for James Timmins Chance (22 March 1814 – 6 January 1902), a grandson of William Chance who had started the family business in 1771. James became head of Chance Brothers until his retirement in 1889, when the company became a public company and its name changed to Chance Brothers & Co. Ltd. Sir James Chance was the first baronet.

=== 20th century ===
The company, in partnership with the Ministry of Munitions' Optical Munitions and Glass Department, expanded significantly during World War I.

In the early 20th century, many new ways of making glass evolved at Chance Brothers, such as the innovative welding of a cathode-ray tube used for radar detection.

In 1933, the company was reported to be involved in an attempt to contact "any intelligent life" on the planet Mars, using adapted lighthouse optics from a mountaintop, the Jungfrau, in Switzerland.

Chance also popularised slumped glass tableware, Fiestaware, with many innovative designs, including the famous Swirl pattern (1955), and also Lace (1951), Night Sky (1957), Green Leaves (1958), Calypso (1959), and floral depictions from 1965 with Anemone.

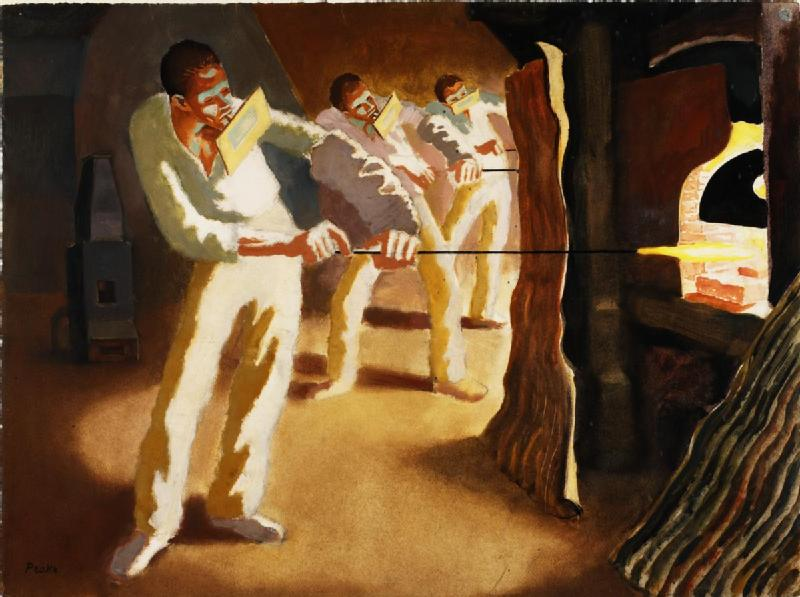
Glass-blowers 'Gathering' from the Furnace. (1943) by Mervyn Peake (Art.IWM ART LD 2851)

During World War II, the company produced cathode-ray tubes for early radar sets, making up to 7,000 per week. In 1943, the artist Mervyn Peake was commissioned by the War Artists' Advisory Committee, WAAC, to paint pictures recording such work.

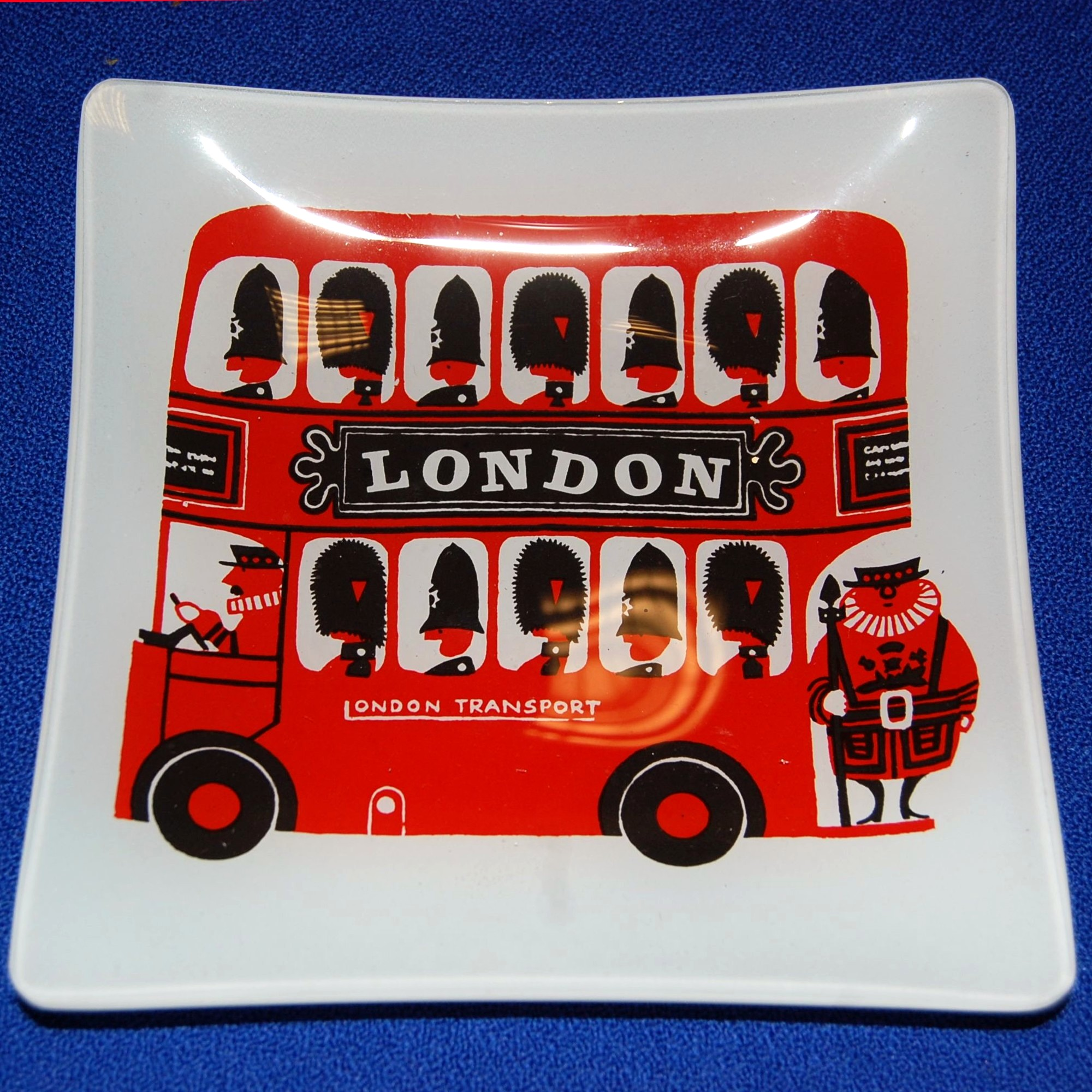
Glass ashtray, from a design by Kenneth Townsend, part of the 'Sights of London' series (1970s)

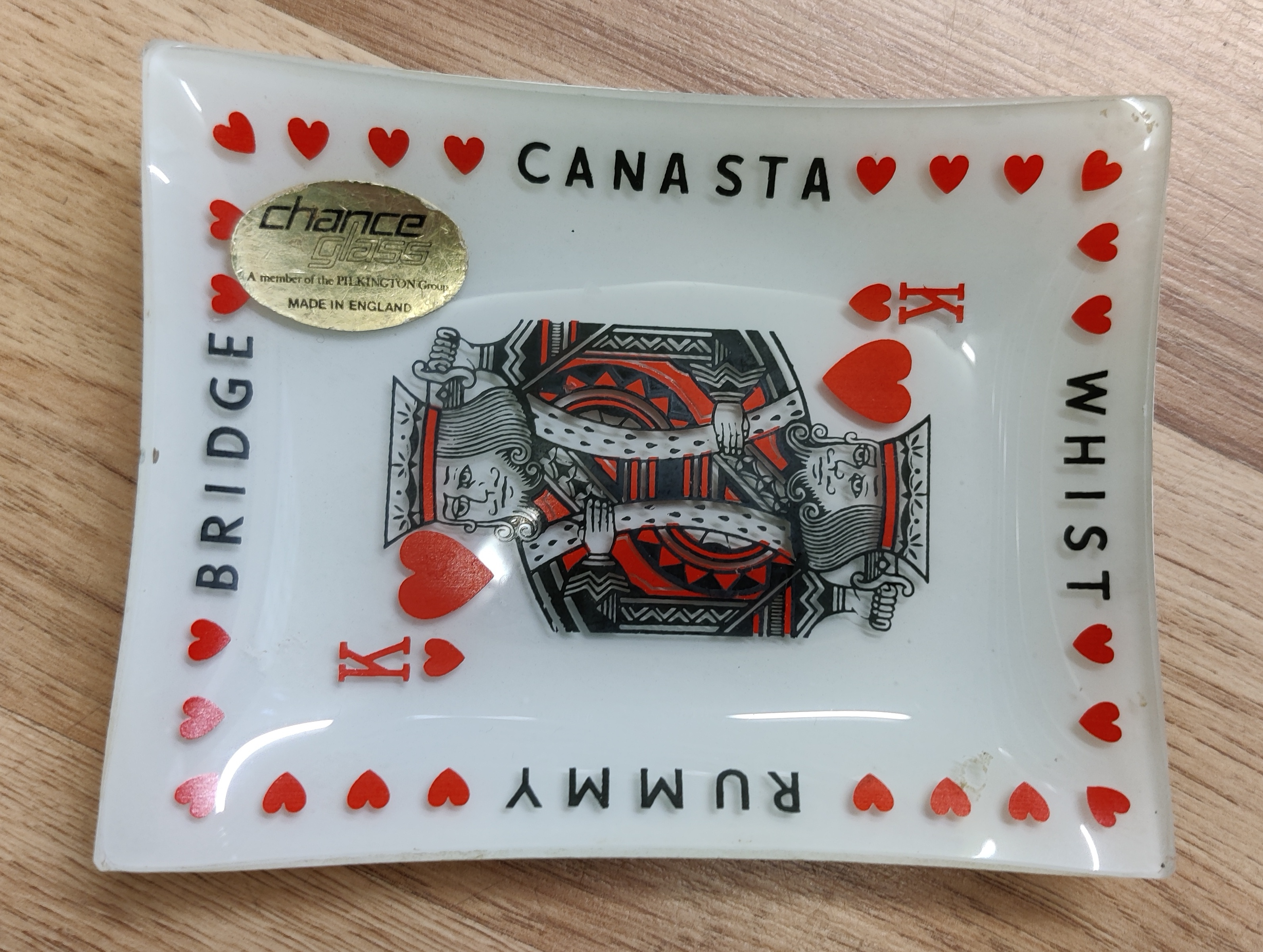
'King of Hearts' ashtray, retaining its "Chance Glass-A member of the Pilkington Group" maker's sticker.

Pilkington Brothers acquired a 50% shareholding in 1945. Still, the Chance operation continued to be largely separately managed, and a factory was established in Malvern, Worcestershire, in 1947 to specialize in laboratory glass; the operation was incorporated as an arm's-length subsidiary. In 1948 the Malvern plant produced the world's first interchangeable syringe. By the end of 1952, Pilkington had assumed full financial control of Chance Brothers, but was not actively involved in its management until the mid- to late-1960s. When plastic disposable syringes displaced glass in the late 1960s, the range of its precision-bore products diversified.

Flat glass production ceased at Smethwick in 1976. The remainder of the works closed in 1981, ending more than 150 years of glass production at Smethwick, and Pilkington's St Helens factories absorbed all flat glass production. Remaining glass tube processing, especially the manufacture of syringes and laboratory glassware, was moved to the Malvern plant.

In 1992, during a period of rationalization at Pilkington's, a management buy-out reverted the Chance plant in Malvern to private ownership; it became an independent company, changing its registered name to Chance Glass Limited but retaining the historical Chance logo. Since then, the company has continued to develop its range of products and processes, and now serves the pharmaceutical, chemical, metrology, electronics, and lighting industries.

== Technology ==
=== Lighthouses ===
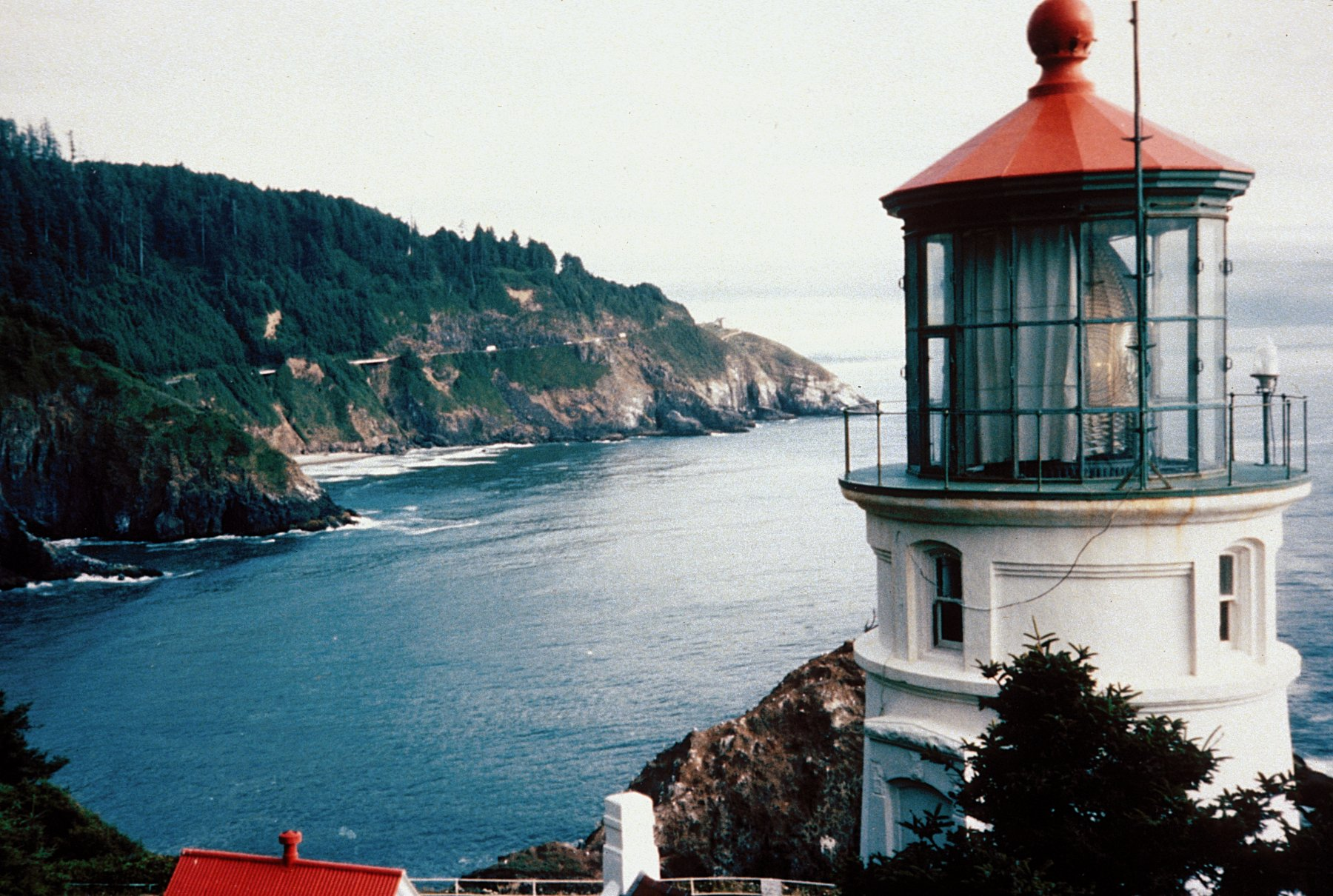
Heceta Head Lighthouse in Oregon. The Chance Brothers Fresnel lens, built in the early 1890s, is still in operation at this historic light station.

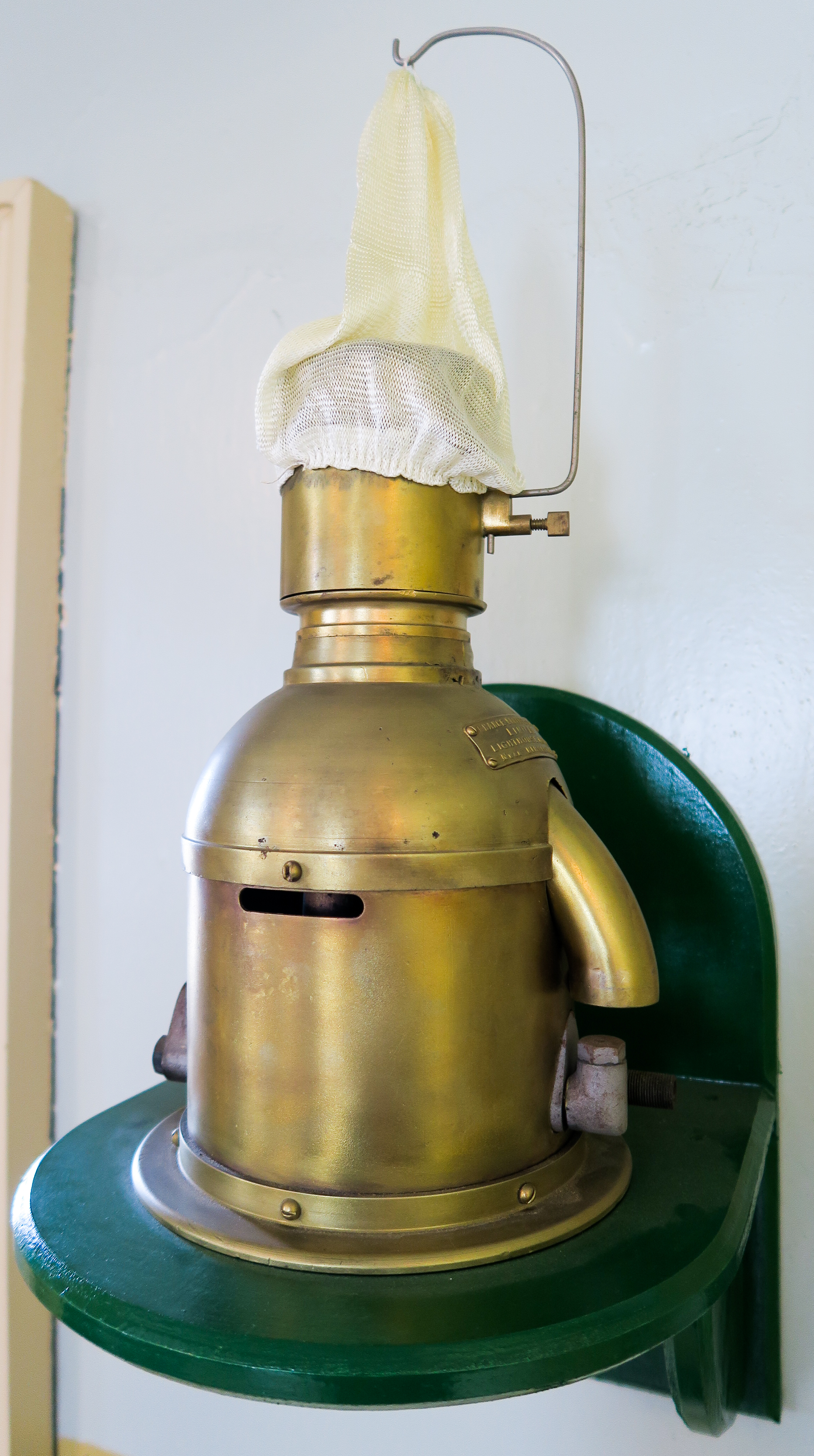
An 85 mm Chance Brothers incandescent petroleum vapour installation that produced the light for the Sumburgh Head lighthouse until 1976. The lamp (made in approx. 1914) burned vaporized kerosene (paraffin); the vaporizer was heated by a denatured alcohol (methylated spirit) burner to light. When lit, some of the vaporized fuel was diverted to a Bunsen burner to keep the vaporizer warm and the fuel in vapour form. The fuel was forced up to the lamp by air; the keepers had to pump the air container up every hour or so. This in turn pressurized the paraffin container to force the fuel to the lamp. The white cloth is an unburnt mantle on which the vapour burned.

From 1851, Chance Brothers became a major lighthouse engineering company, producing optical components, machinery, and other equipment for lighthouses worldwide. James Timmins Chance pioneered placing lighthouse lamps inside a cage surrounded by Fresnel lenses to increase light output; these cages, known as optics, revolutionized lighthouse design. Another important innovation from Chance Brothers was the introduction of rotating optics, allowing adjacent lighthouses to be distinguished by the number of times per revolution the light flashes. John Hopkinson, the noted English physicist and engineer, invented this system while employed at Chance Brothers.

=== Rolled-plate glass ===
One of Chance's major contributions was developing rolled-plate glass. During the 20th century, rolled-plate glass became the mainstay of the company's operation.

=== Clock faces ===
The German opal glass in the clock faces in the Elizabeth Tower, Palace of Westminster (housing Big Ben), was damaged by Luftwaffe bombs during World War II. The damaged glass pieces needed to be replaced, but because of a colour difference, it was decided to replace all the glass. The glass Chance Brothers installed was opal glass.

=== Large glass ===
In about 1848, Chance was one of the first companies to produce very long pieces of window glass, following technology developed to meet an order from Joseph Paxton for a large greenhouse on the Chatsworth estate of the Dukes of Devonshire. It led to a contract to glaze the Crystal Palace in 1851, which earned Joseph Paxton a knighthood.

=== Ultraviolet ===
Based on technology by Sir William Crookes, Chance Brothers perfected the manufacture of glass for the earliest optical lenses to block harmful ultraviolet rays from the sun while retaining transparency. Chance continued to use Crookes as a trade name into the 1960s.

=== Cathode-ray tubes ===
Chance developed cathode-ray tubes (CRTs) just before the outbreak of World War II. Using Hysil glass, a borosilicate glass similar to Pyrex, Chance became a major contributor to developing new methods for producing CRTs during World War II, which became precursors to CRT television screens. At the time, the tubes were used for radar detection displays.

=== Precision bore tubing ===
Chance Bros developed precision bore glass tubing under the trade name Veridia in the 1950s.

== Heritage site ==
The glassworks lies between the Birmingham Canal Navigations (BCN) Old Main Line and New Main Line canals near the Spon Lane locks, with several Grade II listed warehouses and adjacent canal bridges on the BCN New Main Line. The works lie within the Smethwick Summit – Galton Valley Conservation area. A listed memorial to James Timmins Chance, one of the partners, stands in West Smethwick Park.

== Chance Brothers Ltd archives ==
The archives of Chance Brothers Ltd are held at Sandwell Community History and Archives Service. Additional papers are held at the Cadbury Research Library, University of Birmingham.

== See also ==
- Chance baronets

== Bibliography ==
- Encill, David P. (2007). Chance Expressions, A History of Domestic Glassware from Chance Brothers – the study of all the domestic glassware produced by Chance Brothers from 1929–1981. Cortex Design. ISBN 9780954919610.
- Encill, David P. (2014). Chance Additions, A Sequel to Chance Expressions, A History of Domestic Glassware from Chance Brothers. Cortex Design. ISBN 9780954919627.
- Encill, David P. (2024). Chance Reflections, Volume 1: c.1500–1836, The History, Glass and Technologies of Chance Brothers & Associated Companies (Print). Cortex Design. ISBN 9780956809643.
- Chance, Toby; Williams, Peter (2008). Lighthouses: The Race to Illuminate the World. New Holland. ISBN 9781847731746.
- King, Henry C.; Jones, Harold Spencer (2003). The History of the Telescope. Courier Dover. ISBN 0-486-43265-3.
- Kohlmaier, Georg; von Sartory, Barna (1991). Houses of glass: a nineteenth-century building type. Translated by John C. Harvey. MIT Press. ISBN 0-262-61070-1.
- Morrison-Low, A. D. (2007). Making Scientific Instruments in the Industrial Revolution. Ashgate. ISBN 978-0-7546-5758-3.
- Bontemps, Georges (2008). Bontemps on Glassmaking: the Guide du verrier of Georges Bontemps. Translated by Michael Cable. Society of Glass Technology. ISBN 978-0-900682-60-5.
- Elkadi, Hisham (2006). Cultures of glass architecture. Ashgate Publishing. ISBN 0-7546-3813-8.
