= Chance baronets =

Baronetcy in the Baronetage of the United Kingdom

- Escutcheon of the Chance baronets of Grand Avenue
- Creation date: 1900
- Status: extant
- Motto: Deo non fortuna, Through God, not by chance
- Arms: Gules, a saltire vair between two fleur-de-lis in pale and as many towers in fess argent
- Crest: A demi-lion rampant gules, semée of annulets or, holding between the paws a sword erect entwined by a wreath of oak all proper

The Chance Baronetcy, of Grand Avenue in the parish of Hove in the County of Sussex, is a title in the Baronetage of the United Kingdom. It was created on 19 June 1900 for James Timmins Chance, a grandson of William Chance, one of the Chance brothers who started the family business in 1771. He became head of Chance Brothers and Company. He was High Sheriff of Staffordshire in 1868.

He was succeeded by his eldest son. The second Baronet, High Sheriff of Surrey in 1911, died childless and was succeeded by his nephew who was the son of George Ferguson Chance, (High Sheriff of Worcestershire in 1910), second son of the first Baronet. As of December 2017, the title is held by his grandson, the fifth Baronet, who succeeded his father in 2017.

== Chance baronets, of Grand Avenue (1900) ==
- Sir James Timmins Chance, 1st Baronet (22 March 1814 – 6 January 1902)
- Sir William Chance, 2nd Baronet (1853–1935)
- Sir Roger James Ferguson Chance, 3rd Baronet (1893–1987)
- Sir (George) Jeremy ffolliott Chance, 4th Baronet (1926–2017)
- (John) Sebastian Chance, 5th Baronet (born 1954)

The heir apparent is the present holder's son Thomas Hugh Jeremy Chance (born 1983).

== Notes ==
Baronetage of the United Kingdom
Preceded by Newton baronets	Chance baronets of Grand Avenue; 19 June 1900	Succeeded by Chubb baronets
