= West Smethwick Park =

Public park in England

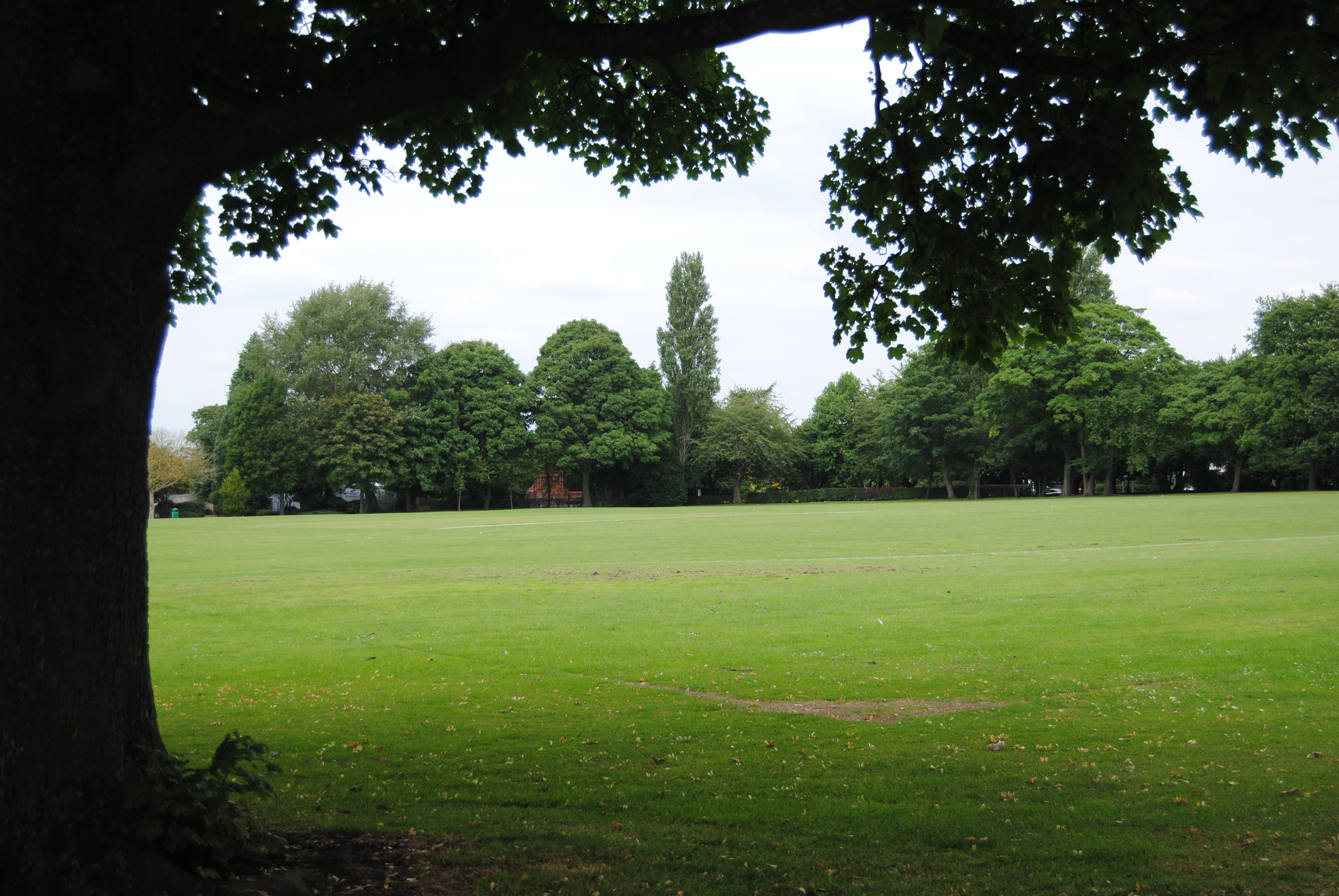
- Interactive map of West Smethwick Park
- Type: Public park
- Location: Smethwick, England
- Coordinates: 52.4960555°N 1.991063°W
- Created: 7 September 1895
- Operator: Sandwell Metropolitan Borough Council

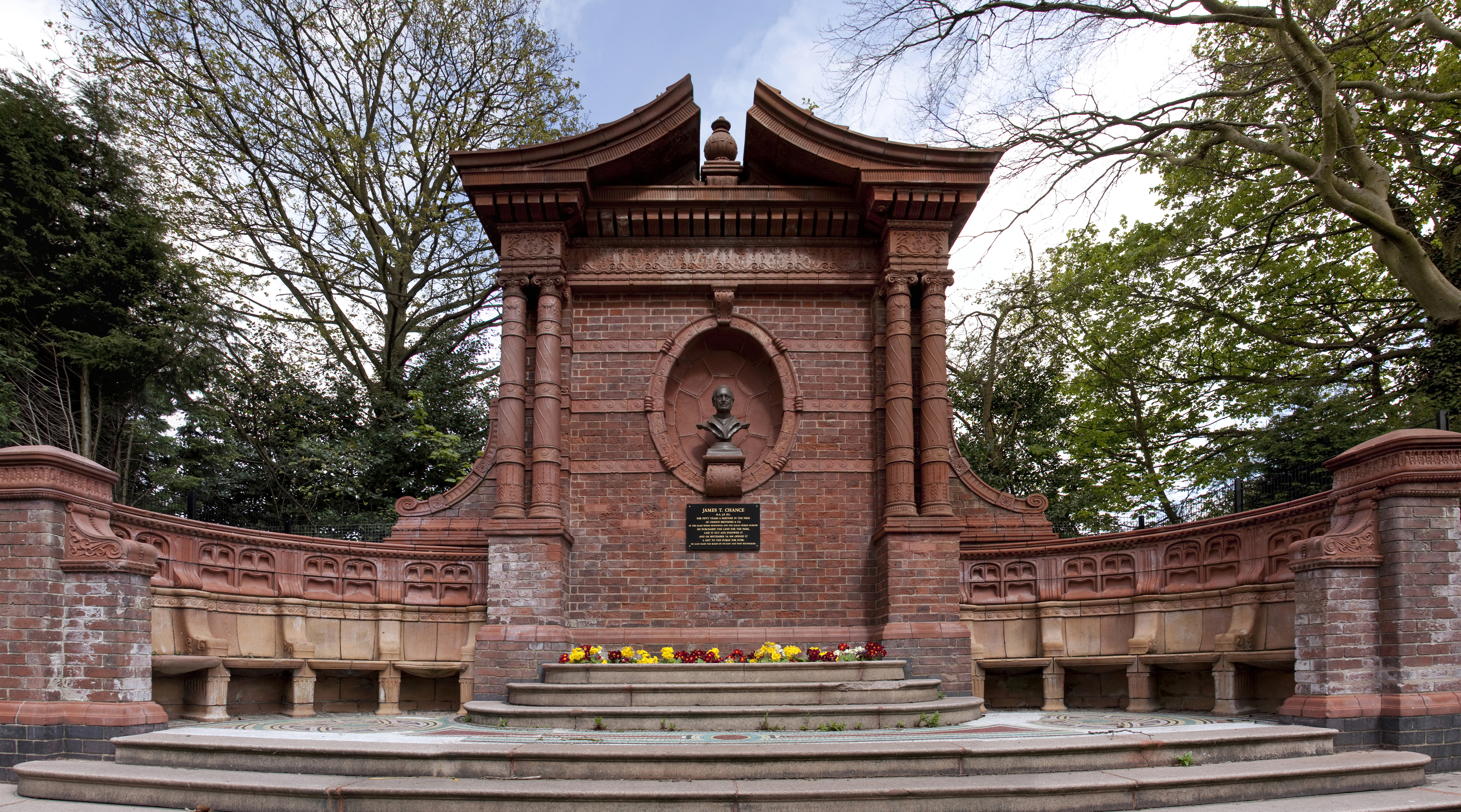
The Chance memorial

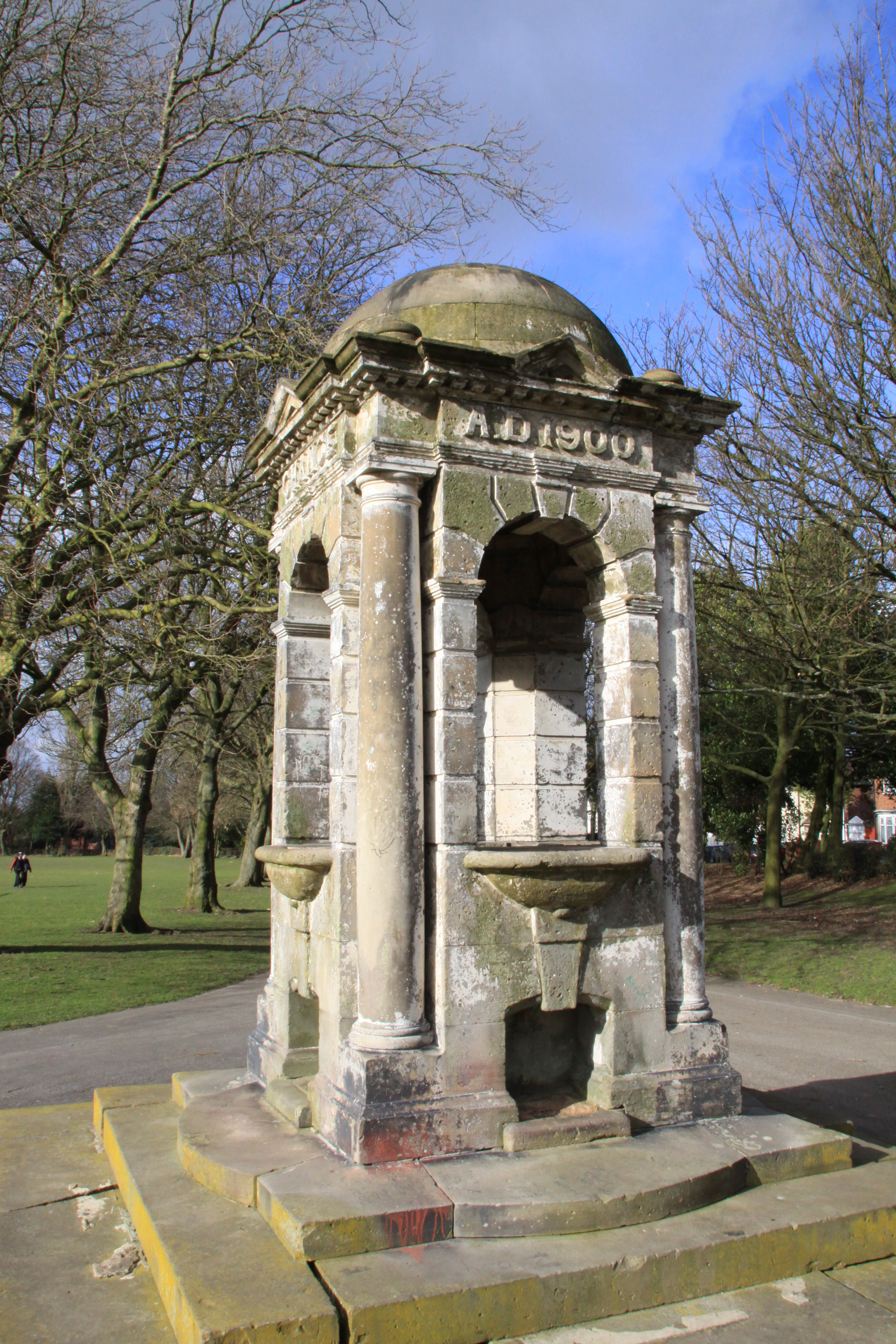
Drinking fountain

West Smethwick Park is a public park in the St Pauls ward of Smethwick, England. It opened on 7 September 1895 on land donated by James Timmings Chance.

Smethwick – and thus the park – was traditionally in Staffordshire, but has been administered by Sandwell Metropolitan Borough Council since 1974. Following successful bids for lottery funding, the park underwent a major restoration in the period 2019 to 2023.

== History ==
At the time of its opening on 7 September 1895, a small stream running through the park formed part of the boundary between the urban districts of Smethwick in Staffordshire and Oldbury in Worcestershire. The layout of the park's 50 acres (20 ha) was planned by Birmingham architect, William Henman. Work included a 600-yard (550 m) new road linking St Paul's Road to Holly Lane, 2,000 yards (1,800 m) of steel railings around the park perimeter and a park keeper's lodge. The stream was used to fill an excavated 5-acre (2 ha) boating lake to an average depth of 4 feet (1.2 m), in the centre of which was an island. Water from a fountain in a smaller pool flowed down fern-covered rocks and under a rustic bridge to the lake. Other features were a boathouse with landing stage, a bandstand in the centre of a circular gravelled area and an octagonal refreshment pavilion with a stove for heating and a ventilation turret. The Birmingham Post applauded the generosity of the benefactor, James Timmings Chance. It stated the park was a great asset for the district, as the streets of Black Country towns were "unhealthy, narrow and confined", with meagre provision for green spaces. Local streets were decorated with flags and bunting for the opening ceremony. A procession of marching bands, civic dignitaries, mounted police, fire brigades, a company from the South Staffordshire Volunteers and representatives of trades unions and other associations made its way from the public hall (now Smethwick Library) to the park, where speeches of thanks were given.

In June 1896, a petition was presented to the park trustees by members of local Sunday School Unions, who requested a cessation of Sunday afternoon boating claiming it was leading to children missing Sunday School. The park trustees after due consideration dismissed concerns for lack of evidence. In the park's early years, ice skating was popular on the frozen lake in Winter, and open-air bathing and fishing in warmer weather. Organised cricket and football matches were played. Annual fêtes were held to raise money for the West Smethwick Park Band, which gave regular Sunday and bank holiday concerts during the season.

The Smethwick Telephone newspaper conducted a review of Smethwick's parks in August 1908. It said West Smethwick Park was breezy and carried the fumes from several factories, disastrous to some flowers; but the gardeners had learned from experience which plantings would be successful. Plants and flowers on show included Jacoby geraniums, tobacco plant, caster oil plant, perilla, sweet aylssum, echeveria, fuchsia, gladioli, Shirley poppy, ageratum, calceolaria violas, Sweet William and penstemmon. The report noted a bowling green had been laid.

In 1912 the park and related endowments were conveyed from the trustees to Smethwick County Borough Council. Three additional lawn tennis courts were laid out in 1913, making six in total. A new entrance lodge was built on the Oldbury side of the park in 1925, and in 1926 a tender was accepted for a new double-gated entrance on Victoria Road. A Sons of Rest shelter was erected in 1933. In 1945 a number of prefabricated homes were built in the park. A miniature golf course was opened on 24 July 1950 on an area of the park that had been a football pitch, but in World War II was used for allotments; the land was too unlevel to be remade for football. News reports show the park was the venue for organised cycle races from the late 1960s. Warley Parks Department announced the opening of a crazy golf course in April 1973. In March 1978 a fire destroyed the boathouse and 23 fibreglass boats inside; however, in 1982 boating was reintroduced after a new brick boathouse was built. The Victorian refreshment pavilion fell out of use after a fire in 1982, and following another fire 3 years later was subsequently demolished.

== Restoration ==
Funding from the Heritage Lottery Fund, the Big Lottery Fund's Parks for People programme and Sandwell Council allowed for a major restoration of the park from 2019 to 2023. Improvements included a café and community rooms within a new pavilion building, installation of outdoor gym equipment, landscaping, restoration of the Chance memorial and stone drinking fountain, entrance gates and piers.

== Memorials ==
The park features a memorial, in brick and terracotta, with a bronze bust, to Sir James Timmins Chance, a partner in the nearby glass-making firm, Chance Brothers. The bust is a replacement; the original was removed by thieves sawing through the retaining fixings in April 1987. Chance purchased the land for the park. Beneath the bust is a plaque reading:

James T. Chance
M.A J.P. D.L.
For fifty years a partner in the firm
of Chance Brothers & Co.
at the Glass Works Smethwick
and the Alkali Works, Oldbury
He purchased the land for the park,
laid it out and endowed it
and on September 7th 1895 opened it
A gift to the public for ever.
He also made the roads on its East and West boundaries.

A stone drinking fountain, installed in June 1905, commemorates John Chance, chairman of Chance Brothers, who died in November 1900. There is also a memorial to Flight Sergeants Cox and Preston, who crashed nearby on 31 July 1944, during World War II. A garden of remembrance was opened in April 1948 by the Mayor, Councillor A Bradford in memory of local people who lost their lives in World War II.
