= Newton baronets of The Wood and Kottingham House (1900) =

Baronetcy in the United Kingdom

Escutcheon of the Newton baronets of The Wood and Kottingham House

The Newton baronetcy, of The Wood, Sydenham Hill, Lewisham, in the County of Kent, and Kottingham House, Burton-on-Trent, in the County of Stafford, was created in the Baronetage of the United Kingdom on 18 May 1900 for Alfred Newton, Lord Mayor of London from 1899 to 1900. The grant was made in connection with the formation of the City of London Imperial Volunteers.

The 2nd Baronet represented Harwich in the House of Commons as a Unionist between 1910 and 1922.

== Newton baronets, of The Wood and Kottingham House (1900) ==
- Sir Alfred James Newton, 1st Baronet (1849–1921)
- Sir Harry Kottingham Newton, 2nd Baronet (1875–1951)
- Sir Harry Michael Rex Newton, 3rd Baronet (1923–2008)
- The Rev. Sir George Peter Howgill Newton, 4th Baronet (born 1962)

The heir presumptive is John Jeremy Newton (born 1952), cousin of the present holder.

== Notes ==
Baronetage of the United Kingdom
Preceded by Webster baronets	Newton baronets of The Wood and Kottingham House; 18 May 1900	Succeeded by Chance baronets
