= Georges Bontemps =

French glass manufacturer

Georges Bontemps was a director of an eminent French glass manufacturer in the 19th century, moved to England to work and is accredited with the re-invention of a technique for making ruby-coloured glass that was first used by the Venetians in the 16th century. He was a jury member at the 1862 International Exhibition in London and the Exposition Universelle (1867) in Paris.

== Early career ==
Georges Bontemps was a director of a French glass manufacturer based at Choisy-le-Roi until 1848. In 1830, he acted as an agent to the Englishman Robert Lucas Chance, assisting in the recruitment of French and Belgian glass workers to work for him – an illegal act that could have resulted in both men being imprisoned. Chance was looking for ways to improve the production of flat glass at his newly formed factory in Smethwick, Birmingham.

In 1848, when the Second French Revolution forced Georges Bontemps to flee to England, he found employment at Chance Brothers, due to his longtime friendship with Chance.

== Later career ==
Bontemps was employed at Chance Brothers as Superintendent of the Coloured & Ornamental departments from 1848 until 1854. During this time, he helped advise on the optics that Chance's fledgling operation was trying to develop for use in lighthouses. He was also instrumental in producing a flint and crown glass disc, measuring 29-inches (74 cm) in diameter, which ironically, was purchased by the French government to be used in a telescope. He is attributed with the re-invention of a technique used to make ruby-red glass that was first produced by Venetian glassworkers in the 16th century.

Bontemps reported on the glass displays at the Great Exhibition of 1851 and was a jury member at the 1862 International Exhibition in London and the Exposition Universelle (1867) in Paris.

== Friends and associates ==
Despite being a great friend of Antoine Claudet (Antoine-François-Jean Claudet), the eminent Victorian photographer and inventor, only one photograph is known to exist of Georges Bontemps and this was not taken by Claudet.

== Books by Bontemps ==
- Guide du Verrier, traite historique et pratique de la Fabrication des Verres, Cristaux, Vitraux
- Paris Librairie du Dictionnaire des Arts et Manufactures: 1868

== Bibliography ==
- Bontemps on Glassmaking: the Guide du Verrier of Georges Bontemps. Translated by Michael Cable, 2008
- History of the Firm of Chance Brothers & Co. Glass and Alkali Manufacturers, A, J.F. Chance, 1919
