= Wednesbury Museum and Art Gallery =

Museum and art gallery in the West Midlands, England

Coordinates: 52.550552°N 2.021995°W

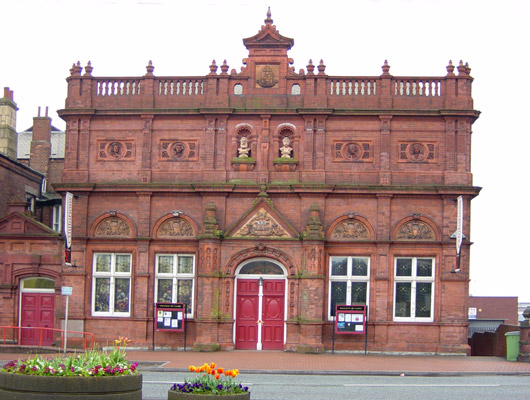
- Established: 1891
- Location: Wednesbury, West Midlands
- Website: Sandwell MBC microsite

Wednesbury Museum and Art Gallery is a purpose-built Victorian art gallery in Wednesbury in the West Midlands of England. It is notable for its Ruskin Pottery collection and for hosting the first public display of the Stuckism art movement.

== Building ==
The building was built in 1891 to house a collection of paintings, drawings and watercolours donated by Mrs Mary Ann Richards on behalf of her late husband Edwin, and cost £5821 to build. It was designed by West Bromwich architects Wood and Kendrick, and built by Henry Wilcock of Wolverhampton. Four panels on the building's facade show the heads of Sir Christopher Wren to represent Architecture, Sir Joshua Reynolds for Art, John Flaxman for Sculpture, and Sir Isaac Newton for Science. Two busts sit in recesses above the entrance, of Alderman Williams and Alderman Lloyd, both mayors of Wednesbury and chairmen of the Art Gallery Committee. Following the Second World War, the museum was used by the council as offices, but returned to use as a museum in 1972, modernised and renovated.

== Permanent exhibitions ==
The museum holds a number of permanent displays:

=== The Ruskin Pottery collection ===
Ruskin Pottery was made in Sandwell, and is sought by collectors globally. The pottery on display exemplifies numerous types of glaze, including Bleu Soufflé, Lustre, Flambé and Crystalline.

=== The Richards Gallery ===
The gallery was originally built to display a large collection of works owned by Wednesbury residents, Edwin and Mary Richards. The couple were prolific collectors of art and especially favoured landscapes. In her will, Mary donated her and her husband's collection of paintings to the town of Wednesbury. These are displayed in the Richards Gallery. The works were stored in caves in Kinver, Staffordshire during the Second World War. Only some of the paintings were returned to public display when the war ended. The collection now consists of fifty-four paintings, following a large sale by Wednesbury Borough Council in 1948.

=== Old toys and games ===
This gallery stores toys and games from Victorian to 20th century. Toy-handling activities are provided for Key Stage 1 classes.

== Joseph Gibbs ==
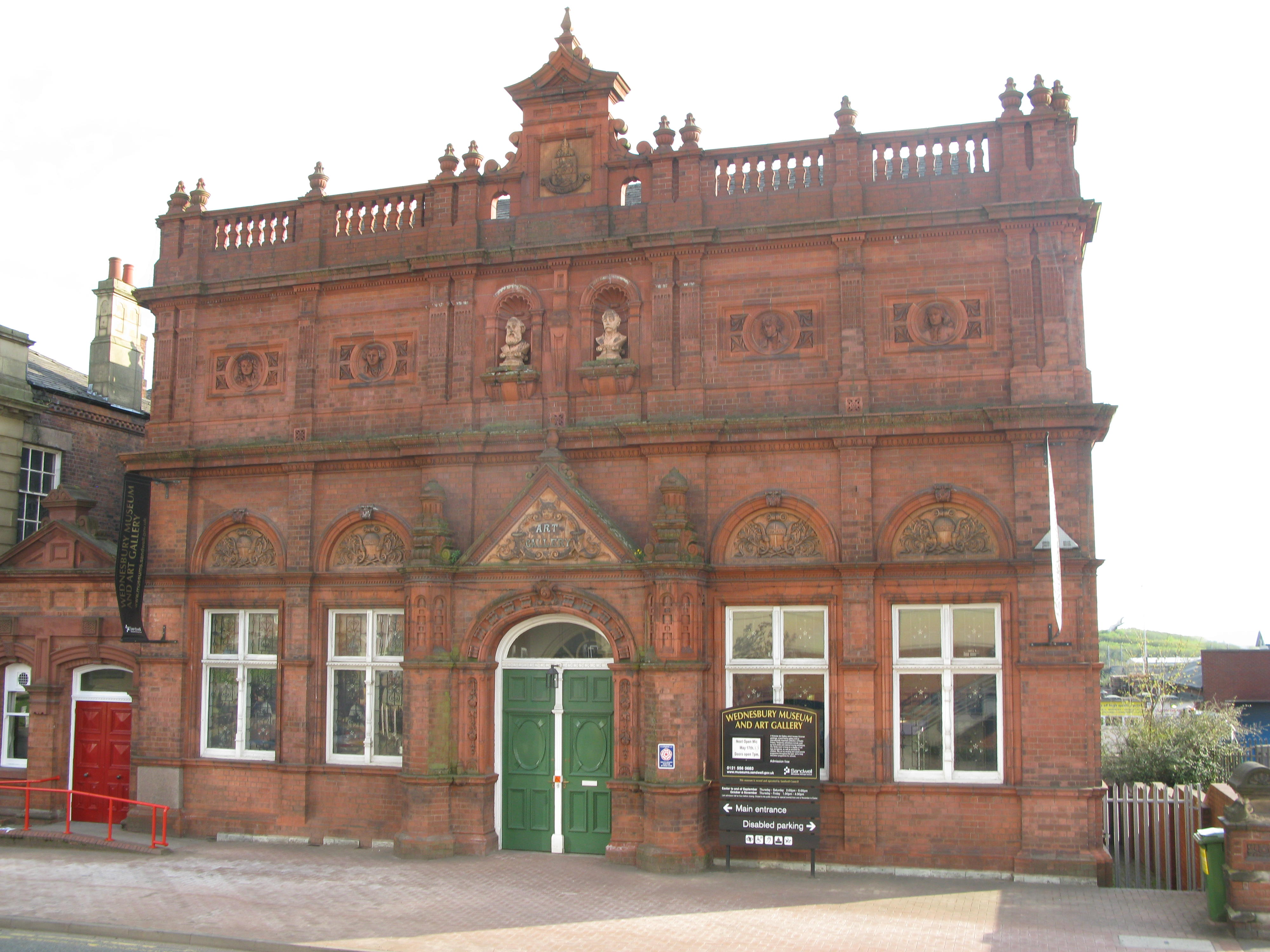
Wednesbury Museum and Art Gallery

The museum has a significant collection of the works of local artist, Joseph Gibbs, including a probably posthumous portrait of Mary Ann Richards, dated 1891.

== Kilvert medals ==
The museum holds the two Crimean War medals of former Wednesbury mayor, Alderman John Ashley Kilvert JP. They were noted missing in 1974, believed stolen. After passing through several hands, they were bought, innocently, by a medal collector from Walsall. After his death, his widow put them up for auction, when their origin was identified and she agreed to donate them back to the museum. The museum also has his portrait, in oil, in which he is wearing civic regalia. The artist is unknown.

== Temporary exhibitions ==
The Museum hosts a lively series of temporary exhibitions which change every six months.

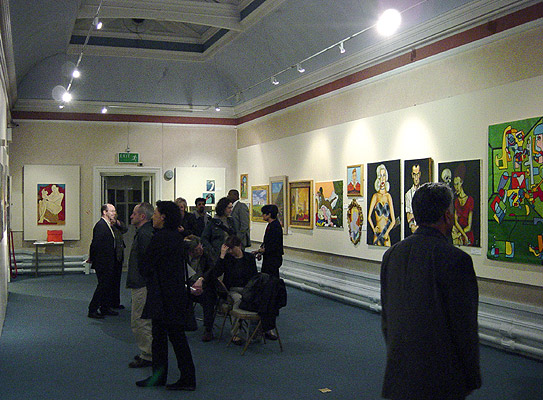
The Stuckist show at Wednesbury, 2003

In 2003, the museum staged Stuck in Wednesbury, the first show in a public gallery of the Stuckism international art movement.

Between July and December 2013, the museum hosted an exhibition of works by the international video artist, Bill Viola. This exhibition was organised through the Artist Rooms programme in conjunction with the Tate Gallery and the National Galleries of Scotland. The works on display included Catherine's Rooms, Four Hands and Surrender.

During the first half of 2014, the museum hosted an exhibition of portraits on loan from Ingestre Hall, the 17th-century Jacobean mansion and seat of the Earls Talbot and the Earls of Shrewsbury.
