= John Ashley Kilvert =

Alderman John Ashley Kilvert JP
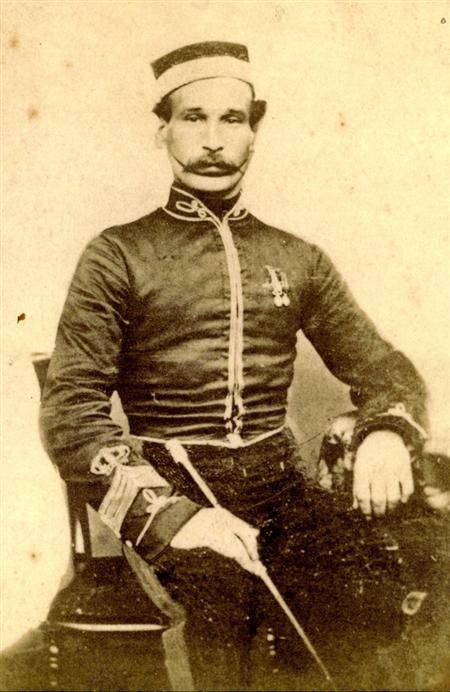
- Kilvert wearing his medals for service in the Crimean War
- Born: 29 September 1833; High Ercall, Shropshire, England
- Died: 17 October 1920 (aged 87); Wednesbury, Staffordshire, England
- Education: High Ercall Grammar School
- Occupations: Cavalryman with the 11th Hussars; Pawnbroker; Mayor of Wednesbury

Alderman John Ashley Kilvert JP (1833–1920) was an English soldier and later businessman and politician, who became Mayor of Wednesbury, then in Staffordshire, England. He served as a cavalryman with the 11th Hussars in the Crimean War, where he survived the Charge of the Light Brigade. His medals are displayed at Wednesbury Museum and Art Gallery.

== Early life ==
Kilvert was born on 29 September 1833, at High Ercall, Shropshire, the son of George Kilvert, a farmer. He was educated at High Ercall Grammar School. His early career was in the wine trade.

== Military service ==
Kilvert enlisted in the 11th Hussars, part of the British Army, in Nottingham. He attained the rank of corporal on 9 July 1854.

Serving in the British army during the Crimean War, Kilvert took part in the Charge of the Light Brigade, on 25 October 1854. He was hit by a musket ball which passed through his right leg, and then into his horse. He then suffered a minor sabre wound to the head. His horse carried him to safety, but had to be euthanised. Kilvert's return is depicted in the painting on the dust jacket of the book Honour the Light Brigade. The next day he was promoted to sergeant. After some delay, during which he was left in a ditch and later found there half frozen, he was taken to Florence Nightingale's Scutari Hospital, and then to Malta, before being returned to England in February 1855.

He later recalled:

I was in the second line and as we careered down the valley and shot and shell were flying about like hailstones, it was only the pace of the horses, that carried us through at all. I don't think if it had been a body of infantry, that a single man could have reached the bottom of the valley. As we advanced, there was a hot fire from the Russian batteries on either side and we survived, rode over the prostrate bodies of those who preceded us. Horses were killed, others galloped about riderless and before long, order was abandoned and it was a desperate attempt to cut our way back through as best we could, as the Russians closed in on us. The Russian gunners were cut down and we started back to our own lines, but I do not know what would have happened had not one of the Russian flanking batteries been attacked and forced to retire.

Of 110 men the forming my regiment, only 25 returned and of 14 comrades sharing my tent, only one was spared besides myself. As to my injuries, I was shot by a musket ball through my right leg and also received a slight cut on the head. My horse was shot under me, but although frightfully injured, bore me back to safety. All day long neither horses nor men tasted food or water.

I lay in a ditch waiting to be removed on an ambulance and had practically given up hope of ever being attended to, as darkness was setting in and I was nearly frozen. However, by-and-by, I heard an ambulance coming and, as the boys say, I hollowed with all my might and very thankful, I was picked up and taken aboard the steamer.

He subsequently worked as an army recruiter based in Bath. He ended his military career with the rank of Troop Sergeant-Major, which he attained in 1857.

He was awarded the British Crimea Medal with bars for Alma, Balaklava and Sebastopol, presented to him by Queen Victoria in a ceremony on Horseguards Parade on 18 May 1855. He also received the Turkish Crimean War Medal (Sardinian variant).

== Civic service ==
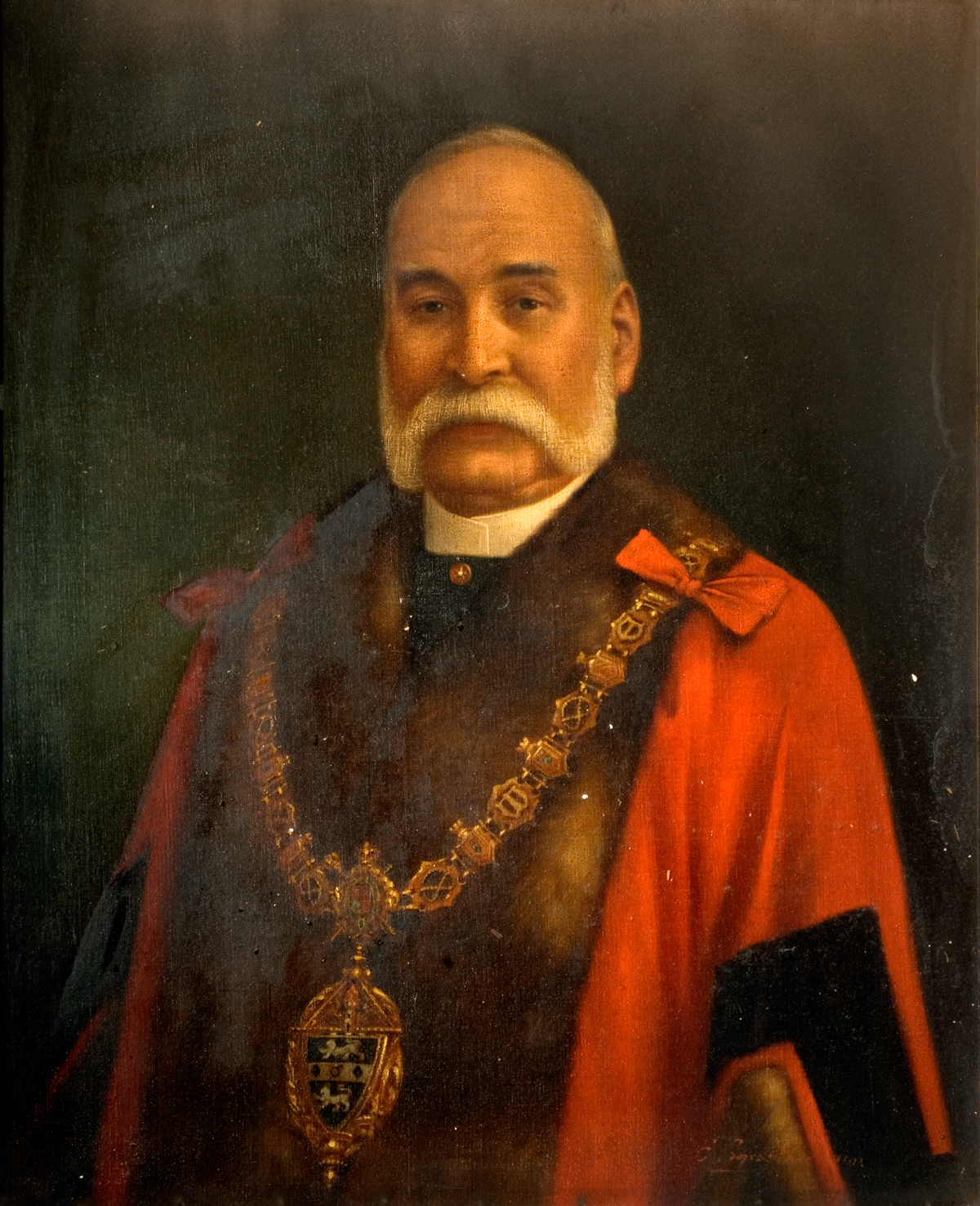
Civic portrait, 1905 or 1906

After the war, Kilvert lived in Coventry, married there, and had a son named George. On the death of his wife, he moved to Wednesbury, and remarried. He operated a pawnbrokers from premises in Union Street where he also lived. His second wife died in 1900, as did his son in 1902. He sold the pawnbroking business and moved to a house at 13 Pritchard Street, which he named 'Balaclava House', after the battle.

He was elected to the town council in 1886, becoming an Alderman and later, in 1905, a year before he stood down from public service, Mayor. As he was a widower, he selected his niece, Mrs. Harris, to act as his Mayoress. He also served as a magistrate (JP).

== Legacy ==
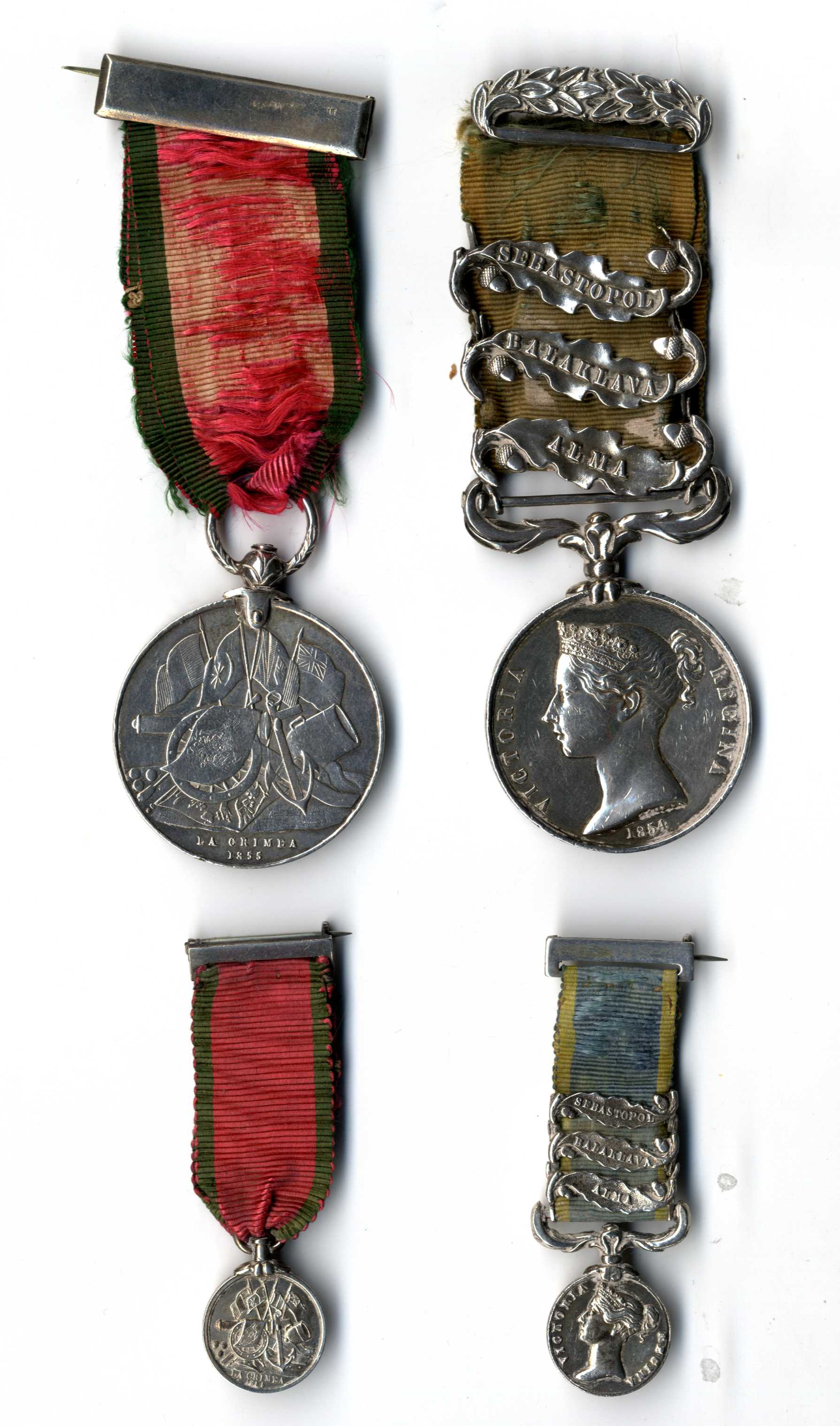
Kilvert's medals. The lower pair are miniatures, worn with mess dress. The Turkish award is on the left.

Kilvert died in Wednesbury on 17 October 1920 and was buried in plot A1037 at Wood Green Cemetery there on 22 October. He was the last but two of the British Charge of the Light Brigade participants to die. His gravestone does not mention his role in the charge.

He bequeathed his medals, and the sword he used during the charge, to Wednesbury Museum. The medals were noted as missing in 1974, believed stolen. After passing through several hands they were bought, innocently, by Walter Hands, a medal collector from Walsall. After his death, Mrs Hands put them up for auction in 2013, when their origin was identified and she agreed to donate them back to the museum.

A portrait of Kilvert, in oil, in which he is shown wearing civic regalia, is also at Wednesbury Museum and Art Gallery. The artist is unknown.

The sword Kilvert used at the Charge of the Light Brigade is in the possession of Sandwell College where one of the floors at Central Campus is named after him.
