= Joseph Gibbs (artist) =

- Occupation: Portrait painter
- Years active: 1852-1907

Joseph Gibbs was a portrait painter who worked in the area around Smethwick, then South Staffordshire (now part of the West Midlands county), England, during the period 1852 to 1907.

He exhibited at some Royal Birmingham Society of Artists events.

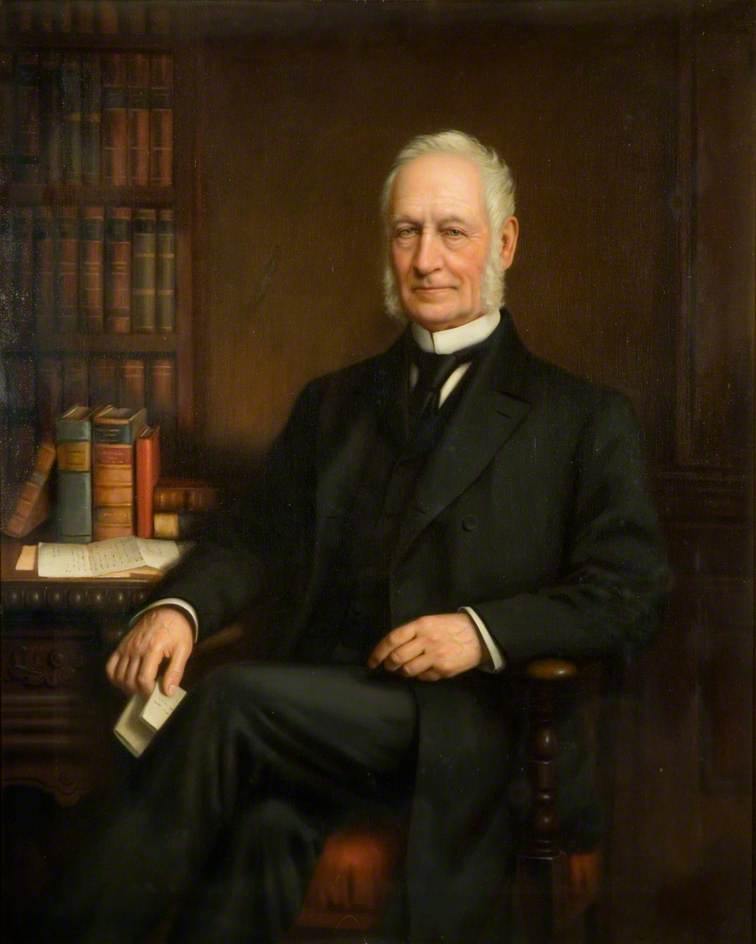
James Timmins Chance (1902) by Joseph Gibbs

Six of his works (five portraits and a pastoral scene showing two children crossing a river) are in the collection of Wednesbury Museum and Art Gallery:

- Mary Ann Richards (painted 1891)
- Muriel Dorothy Windle (1898)
- Sir James Timmins Chance (1902)
- Alderman George Bowden, Mayor of Smethwick (1904)
- Stepping Stones (The Nearest Way Home) (1907)
- Frederick Talbot, Headmaster of Chance's School, Smethwick
