= Robert Lucas Chance =

English glass merchant (1782–1865)

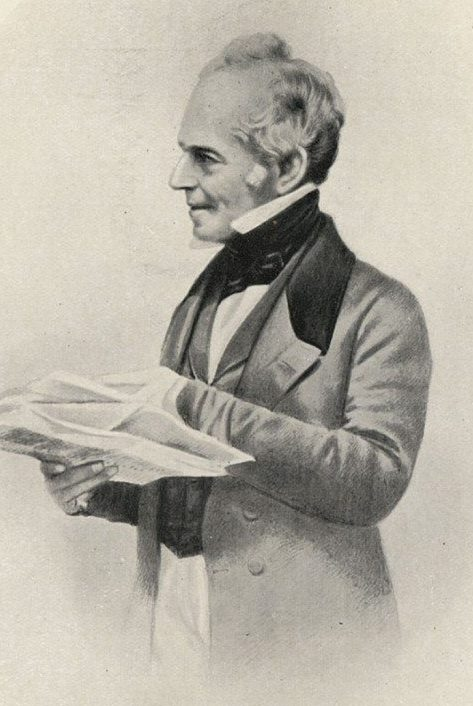
Undated photo

Robert Lucas Chance (8 October 1782 – 7 March 1865), known as Lucas Chance, was an English glass merchant and manufacturer in Birmingham. He founded the company which became Chance Brothers.

== Family background ==
Lucas Chance was the fifth child and eldest son of William Chance (a partner in Nailsea Glassworks) and Sarah Lucas (daughter of John Lucas).

== Working life ==
Chance started work at his father's business in Birmingham at the age of 12, then started his own glass merchant business in London in 1815. This involved many trips to France where he formed alliances with French owners. In 1822 he purchased the British Crown Glass Company, following the death of the owner, Thomas Shutt, for £24,000 (equivalent to £2,669,000 in 2024). In 1828, after John Hartley's contract with the Nailsea Glassworks had expired, Lucas enticed Hartley to work as a manager. It was expected that John Hartley would become a manager, but he died in 1833 before this was formalised.

After experiencing financial difficulties in 1832, Lucas was then saved by his brother, William, who also became a partner, temporarily taking over the lease. The partnership with Hartley's sons, James and John Jnr, in 1834 was dissolved in 1836 due to many differences of opinion and the business was then named Chance Brothers & Company.

During his time in London with his glass merchant business, he formed an acquaintance with Georges Bontemps, a leading director of a glassworks in France, who would later assist at Chance Brothers following his exile from France in 1848. Chance was instrumental in introducing the method of sheet glass production for making flat glass for (primarily) windows. This would eventually supersede the previous working method of crown glass. He was also one of the great exponents of removing the crippling excise duty and the Window Tax. Following these actions, the glass trade in England started to flourish.

In 1851, Chance Brothers supplied the glass to glaze the Crystal Palace, which was probably partly due to Chance's previous links with Joseph Paxton, the architect, when supplying glass for the greenhouses at Chatsworth House.

The two brothers were noted as being very philanthropic, founding a school (1845), a library and a church, all primarily for the workforce. Lucas Chance died in 1865, and was buried in Key Hill Cemetery, Birmingham.
