= World of Glass, St Helens =

Museum and visitor centre, Merseyside, England

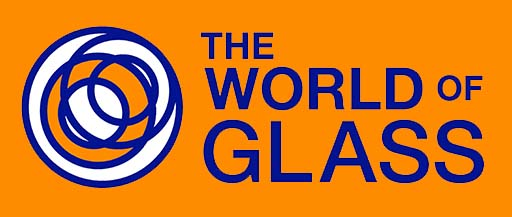

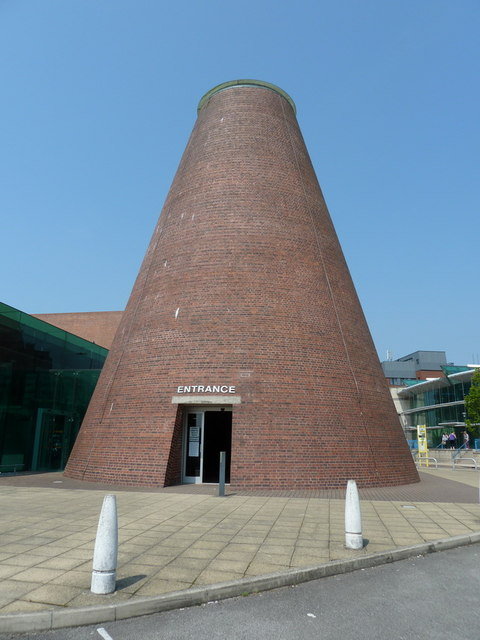
- The World of Glass entrance
- Established: 2000
- Location: Chalon Way East, St Helens, WA10 1BX, England
- Coordinates: 53.4501°N 2.7349°W
- Type: Museum and visitor centre
- Collections: Pilkington collection; St Helens history collection
- Collection size: 7,000
- Parking: On site
- Website: www.worldofglass.com

The World of Glass is a local museum and visitor centre in St Helens, Merseyside, England. The museum is dedicated to the local history of the town and borough primarily through the lens of the glass industry but also looking at other local industries.

The World of Glass was founded in 2000 and is an amalgamation of the former Pilkington Glass and St Helens Borough Council collections. The purpose-built premises was constructed adjacent to the Pilkingtons glassworks and the stretch of the St Helens Canal known as the "Hotties".

The World of Glass was named as England's Best Small Visitor Attraction (2006).

== History ==
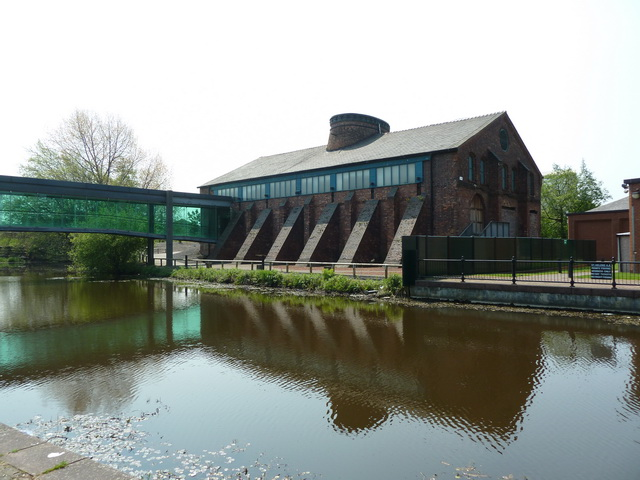
Glass footbridge across the canal to the grade II* listed Tank House.

In the early 1990s, Pilkingtons undertook the £1 million restoration of the Grade II*-listed Pilkington's Jubilee Cone building, a brick cone structure built in 1887 to house the first ever continuous glass making furnace. Following the restoration, Pilkingtons floated the idea of utilising now redundant adjacent factory space (known locally as "The Hotties") as a museum for its historic glass collection. With subsequent interest from the Borough Council looking for somewhere to host their collection of local historical artefacts, the centre was funded through a National Heritage Lottery Fund contribution of £8,385,000 and European support in the form of Objective One and RECHAR II grants totalling £2,240,000 in addition to other grants.

The £14 million visitor centre was opened in March 2000 in a ceremony attended by the first chairman of the World of Glass and former chairman of Pilkington Glass Sir Antony Pilkington, the Mayor of St Helens Councillor Patricia Jackson as well as St Helens R.F.C. players and other dignitaries and special guests including local school children.

== Museum and visitor centre ==
The museum and visitor centre comprises:

- The Pilkington collection - once part of the Pilkington Glass Museum, previously located at the company's headquarters on Prescot Road.
- The History of St Helens collection - from the St Helens museum, previously located on College Street.

Currently the museum holds a total of over 7,000 artefacts.

The museum has two main galleries - the Glass Roots Gallery and the Earth into Light Gallery. The first is concerned with the history of glass, its role in everyday life, and contains artefacts that date back as far as Ancient Egypt. The second tells the story of the growth of the town of St Helens as it moved from relative insignificance to become a world leader in glassmaking.

There are live glassblowing demonstrations daily and visitors can try the art of glassblowing on one of their courses.

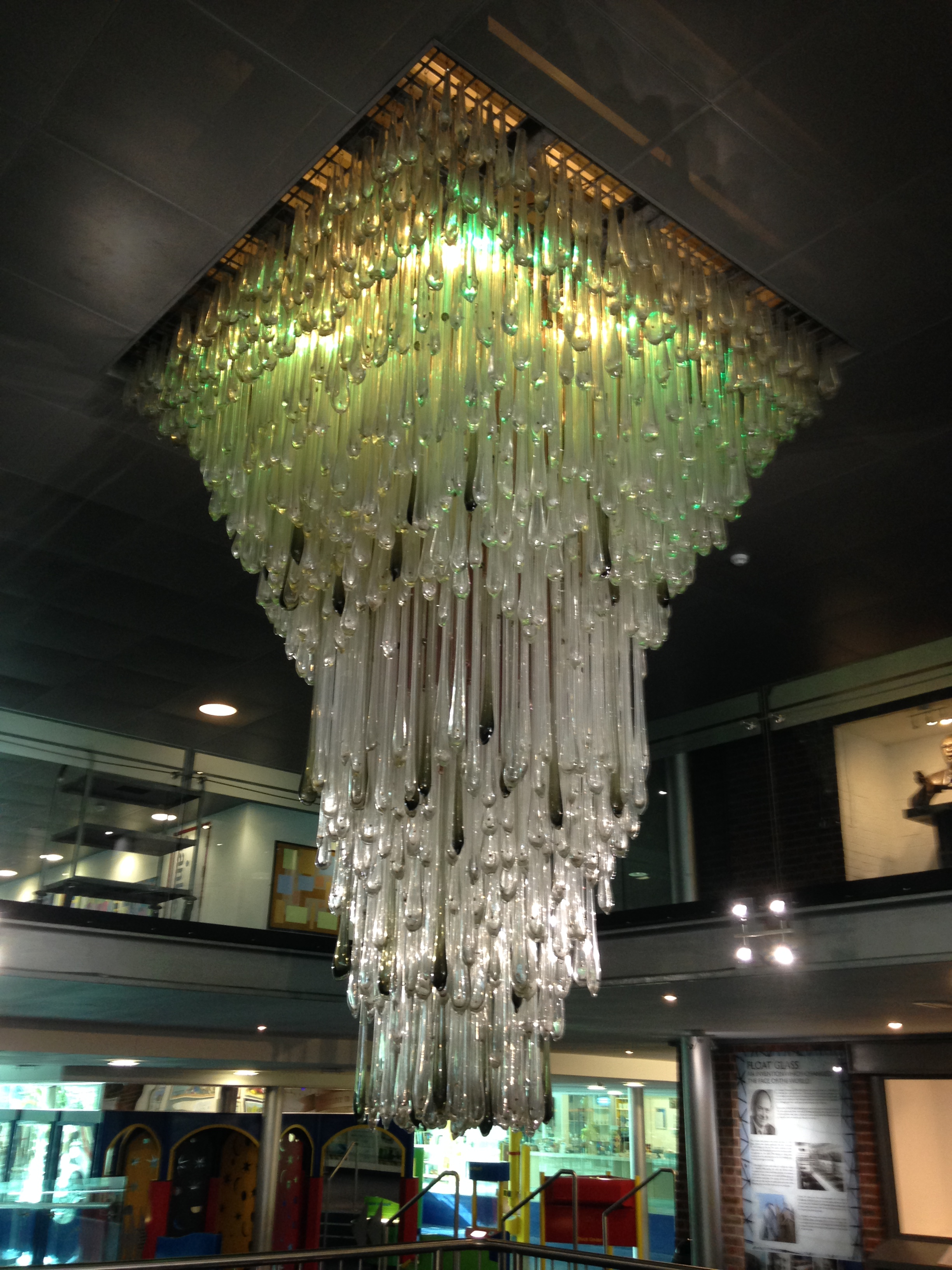
Manchester Airport chandelier - exhibited at the World of Glass.

The Victorian furnace and underground tunnels of the world's first regenerative glass making furnace, built in 1887 by William Windle Pilkington, can also be explored at the visitor centre. There is an artisan gift shop and a café which looks out over the stretch of the St Helens Sankey Canal known as the Hotties.

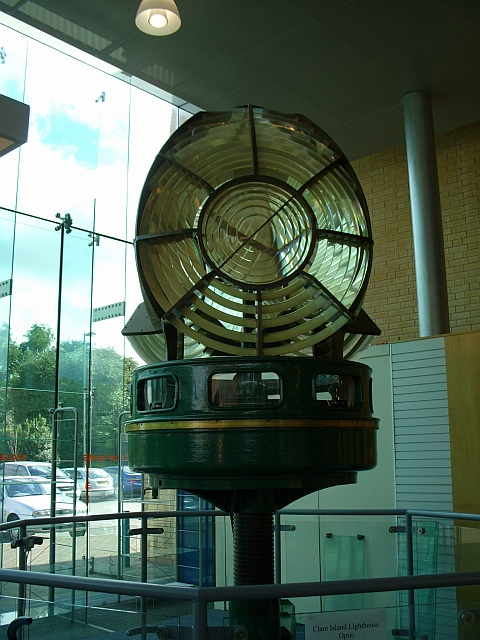
Made in 1913 by Chance Brothers of Birmingham, the Clare Island lighthouse optic is on permanent rotating display at the World of Glass.

=== The Manchester Airport chandelier ===
Since 2008 the World of Glass has been home to one of four chandeliers, restored by David Malik & Son, which originally hung in the main hall of Manchester Airport. With 1,300 clear, smoked grey and amethyst lead glass droplets, individually blown by master craftsman Bruno Zanetti and weighing two tons, each chandelier was commissioned at a cost of £3,000 in the 1960s but would now cost more than £250,000.

=== The Clare Island Lighthouse optic ===
Off the west coast of Ireland, Clare Island Lighthouse was decommissioned in 1965 after almost 160 years' service. The lighthouse optic, made in 1913 by Chance Brothers of Birmingham, found a new home at the Pilkington Glass Museum and then the World of Glass.

The Clare Island Lighthouse itself was transformed into an upmarket guesthouse.

== St Helens library ==
A brand-new lending library for St Helens, provided by St Helens Council, opened at the World of Glass in September 2020. Occupying space on both the ground floor and mezzanine level, the lending library is for both children and adults, complete with more than 18,000 books.

== Gallery ==
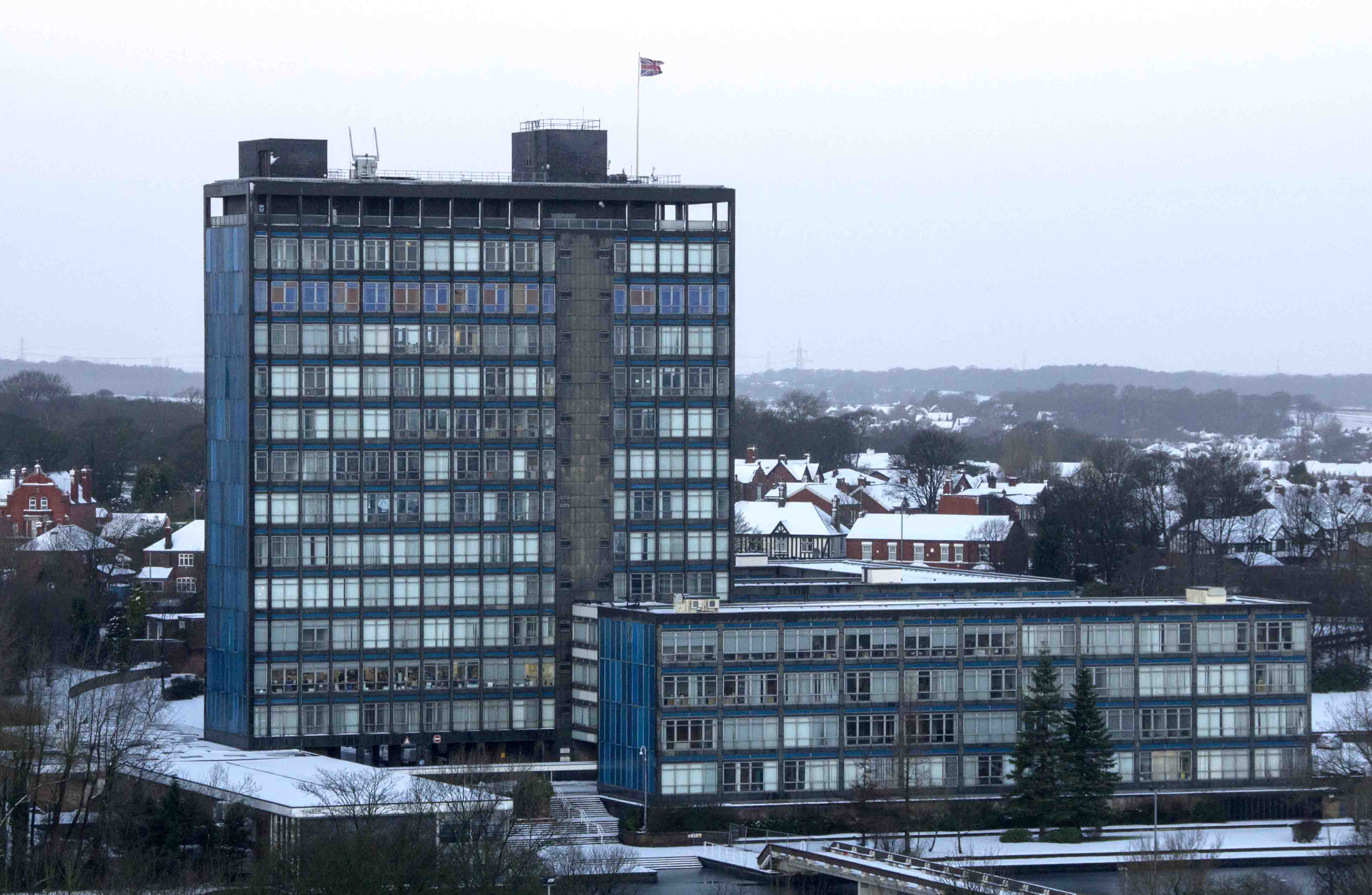
The World of Glass is home to the Pilkington collection, moved from the former Pilkington Glass Museum at the company's Prescot Road headquarters.

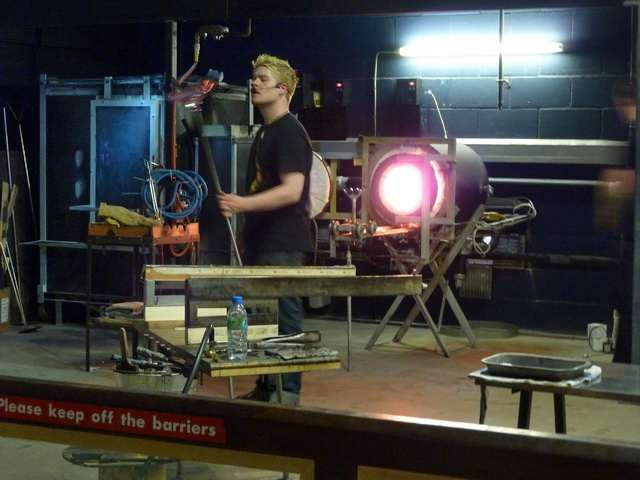
Glassblowing demonstration at the World of Glass.

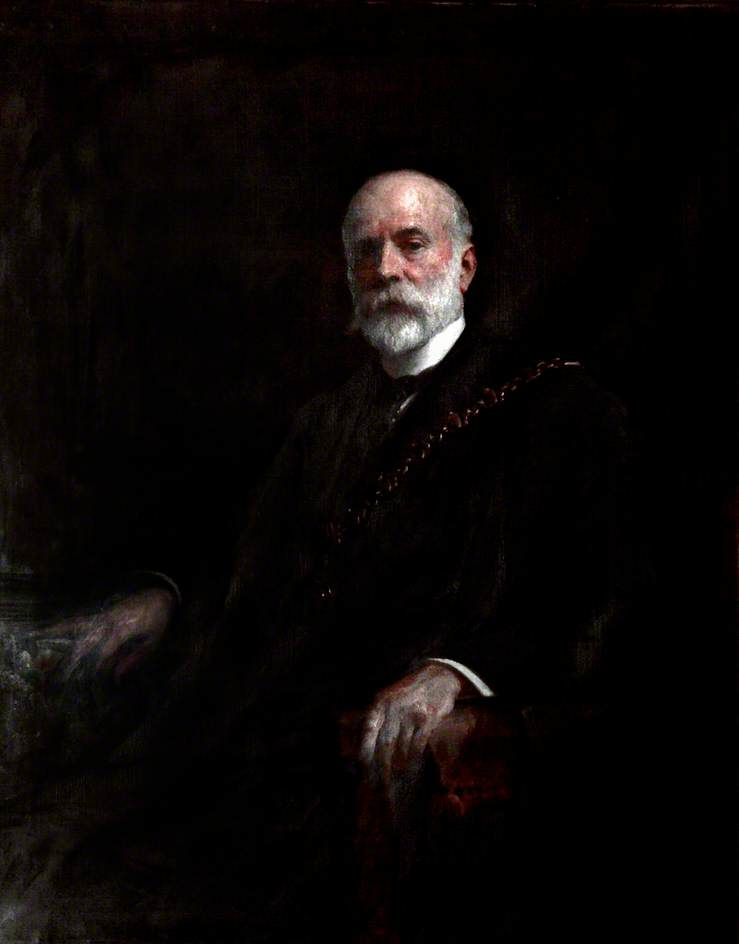
Colonel Richard Pilkington JP MP - portrait at the World of Glass.

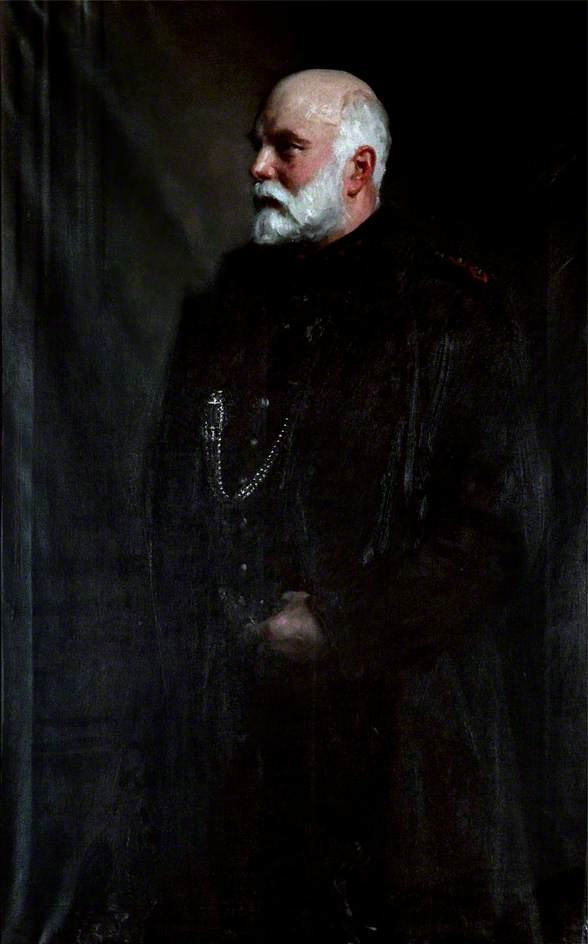
William Windle Pilkington - portrait at the World of Glass.

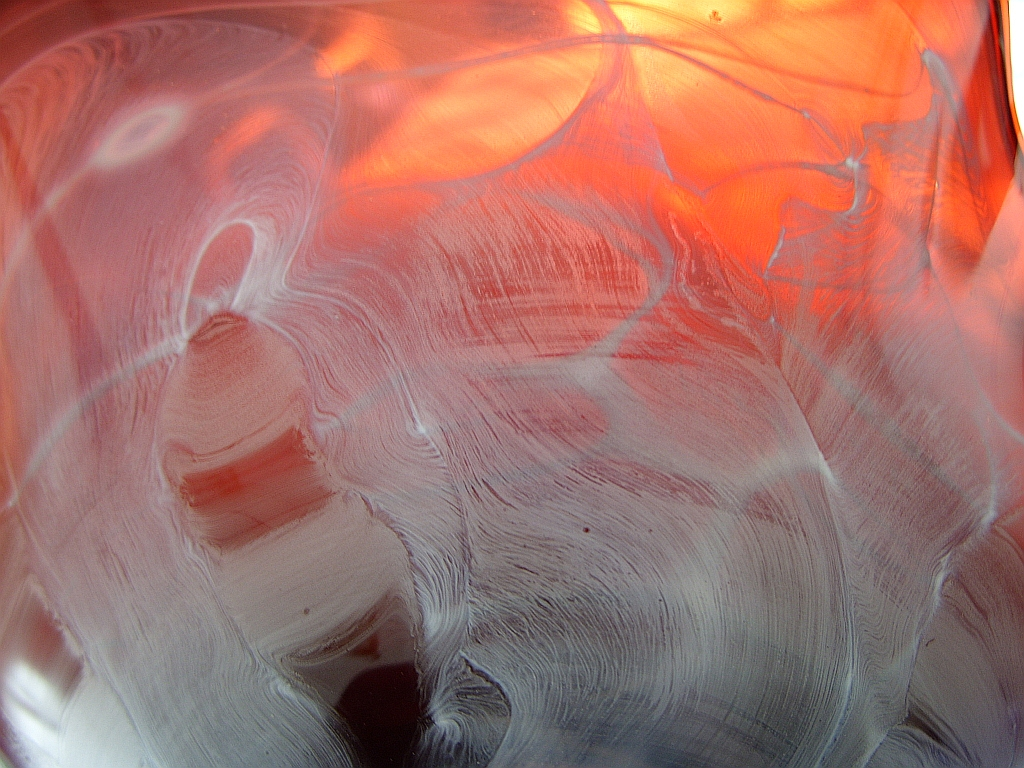
Detail of hand-blown bowl from the World of Glass.

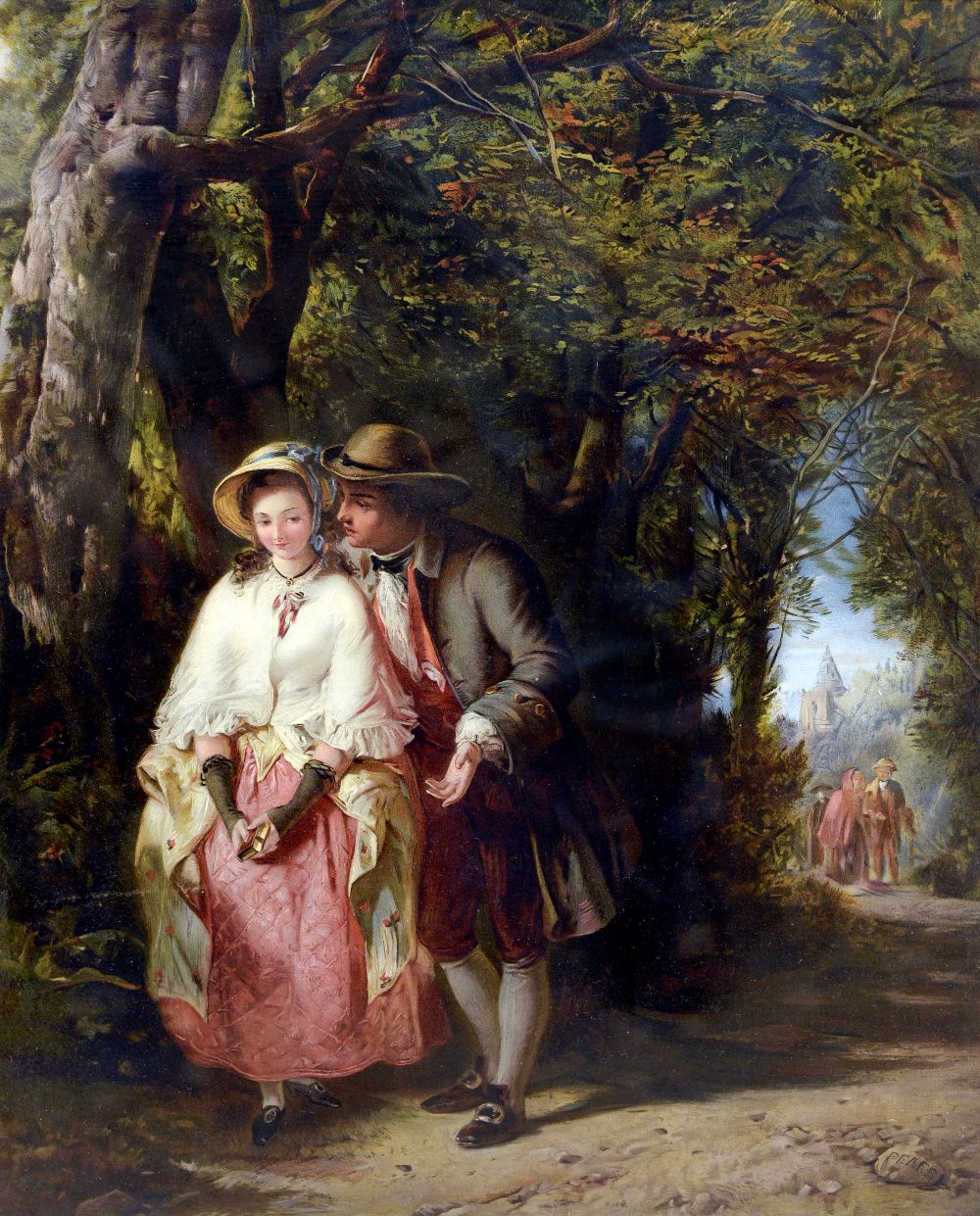
Sunday Morning by Abraham Solomon.

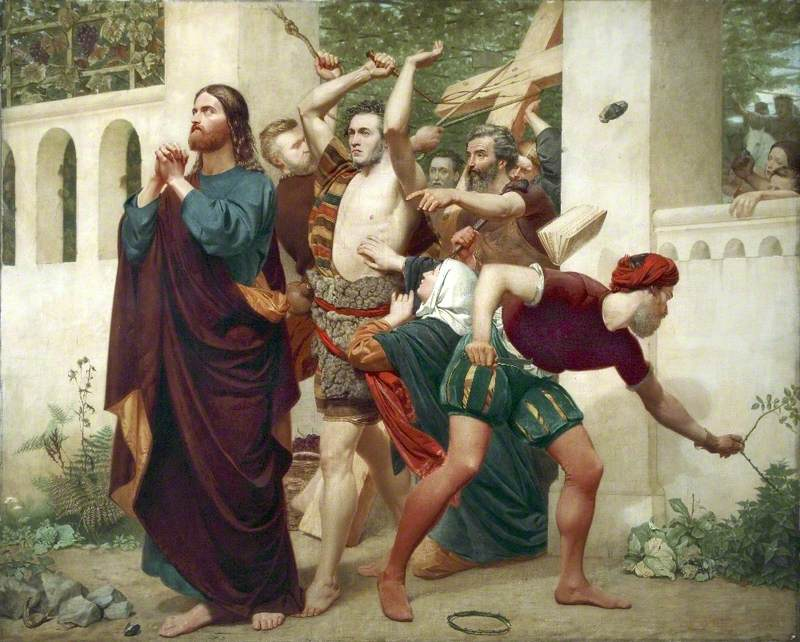
The Heir Cast Out of the Vineyard by William Cave Thomas.

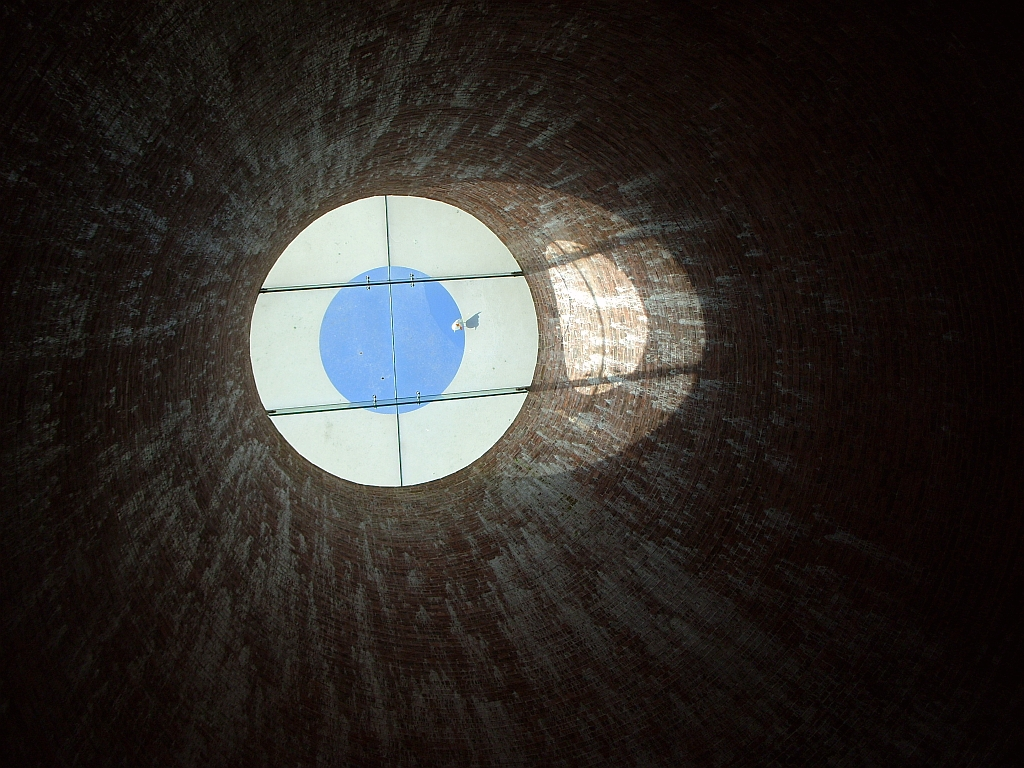
Looking up towards the tip of the cone entrance at the World of Glass.

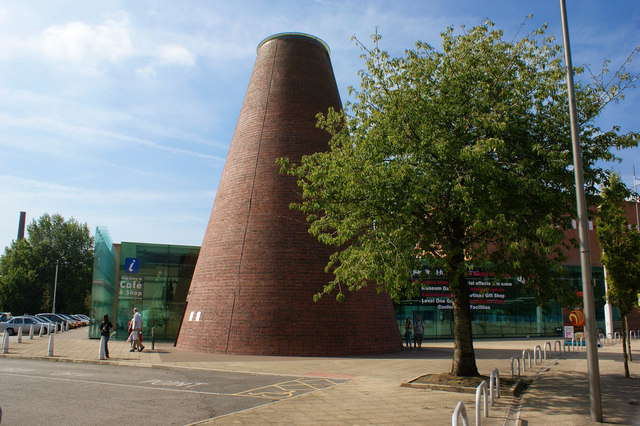
Outside the World of Glass.

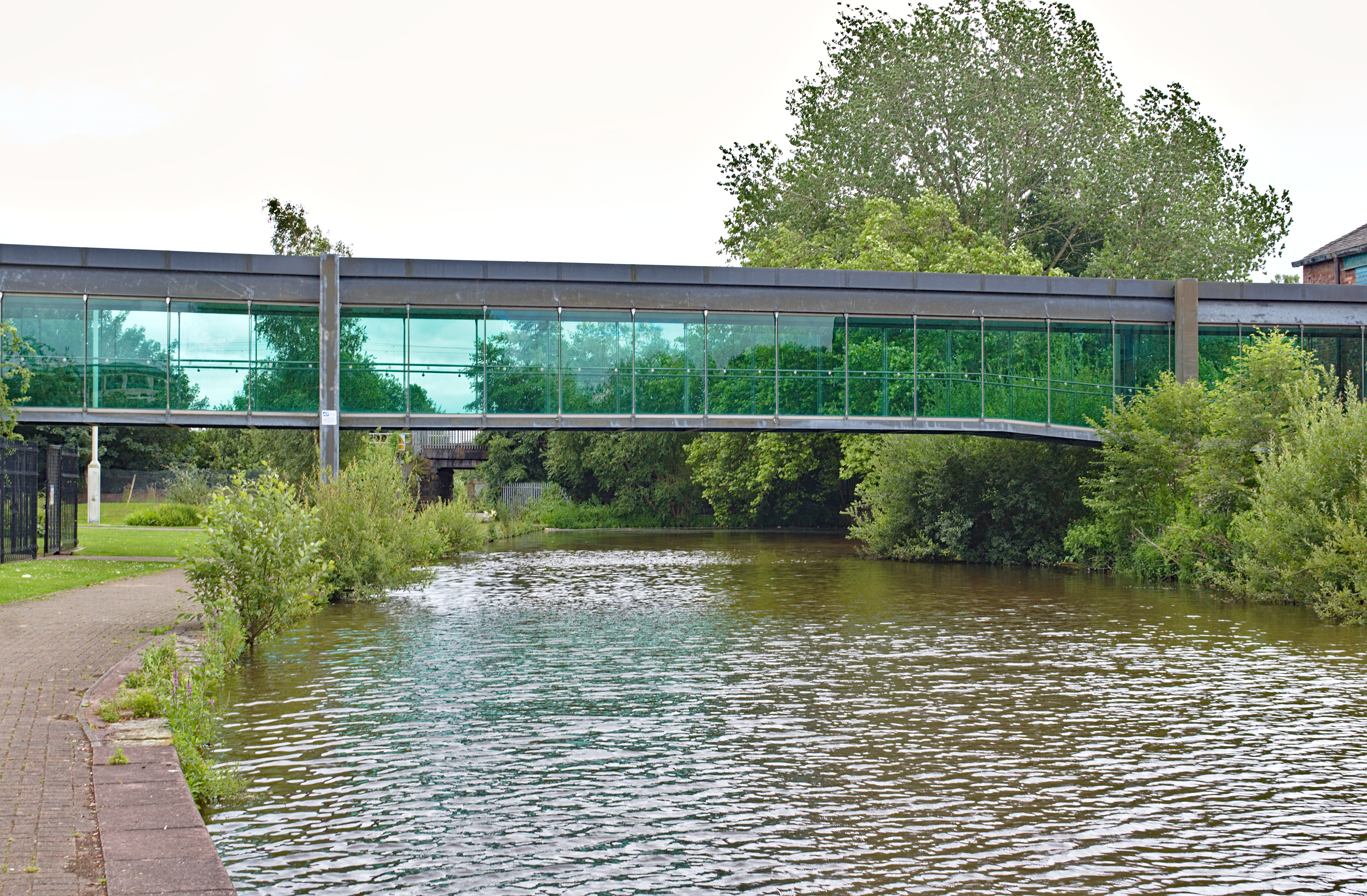
Glass footbridge over the canal at the World of Glass.

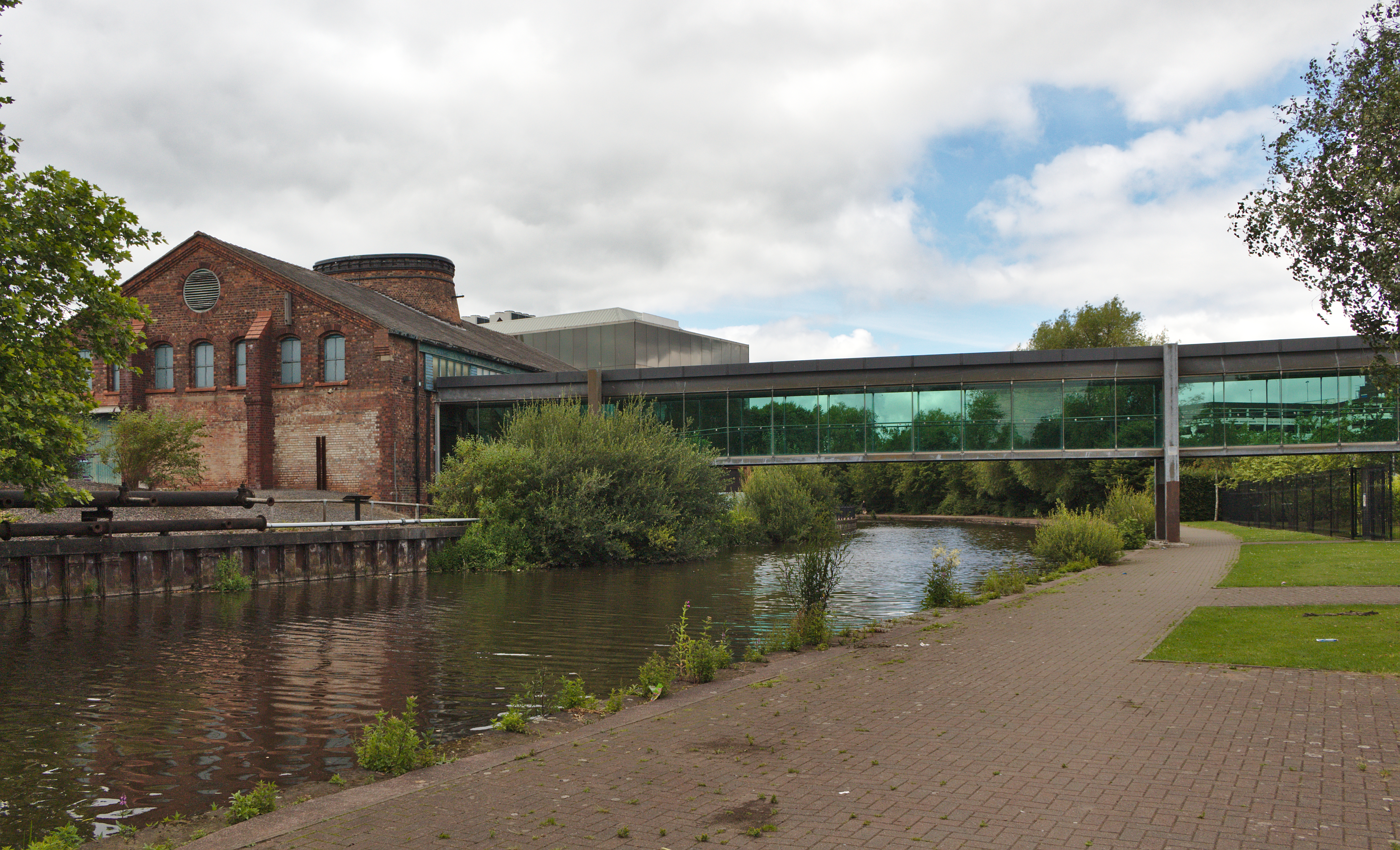
Tank House and glass footbridge at the World of Glass.

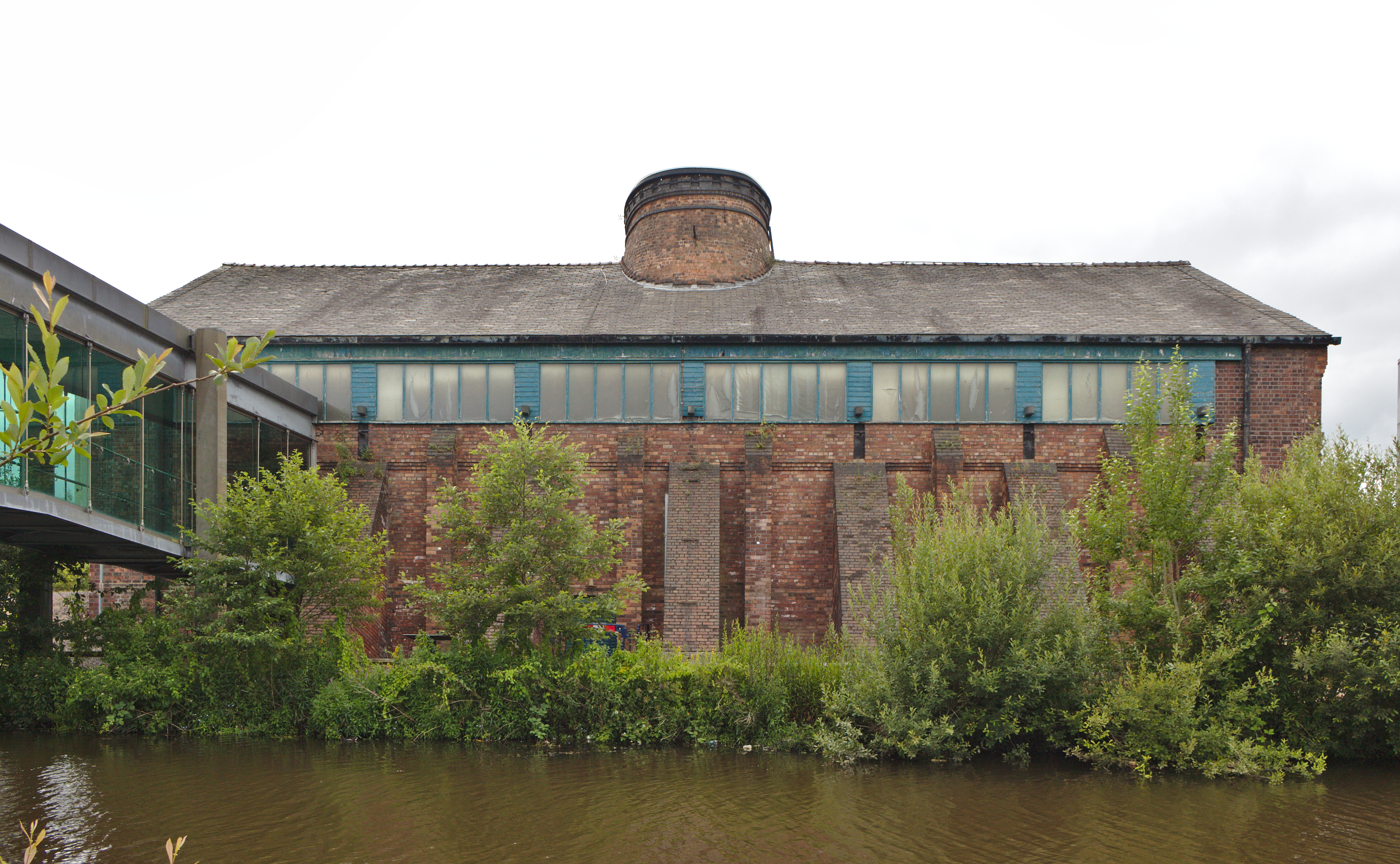
Exterior of the grade II* listed Tank House.
