= Thales Optronics =

French optronics manufacturer

- Company type: Division
- Traded as: FTSE 100 Thales SA (HO.PA)
- Industry: Defence
- Headquarters: Paris
- Key people: Patrice Caine
- Products: Optoelectronics
- Parent: Thales Group
- Subsidiaries: Thales Optronics Limited; Thales Optronique SA; Thales Optronics B.V.

Thales Optronics is a optronics manufacturer and a division of the French defence corporation Thales Group. It is headquartered in Paris. The company has three main subsidiaries: Thales Optronique SA in France, Thales Optronics Limited in the United Kingdom and Thales Optronics B.V in the Netherlands.

== History ==
=== United Kingdom ===
Thales' optronics businesses in the UK trace their origins to Pilkington Optronics, which was formed by Pilkington plc in 1988 to take control of the company's optronics businesses: Pilkington PE located in North Wales (formed in 1966) and Barr and Stroud, which was based in Glasgow. Pilkington PE later became Thales Optics Ltd., which was divested from Thales in December 2005 as Qioptiq Ltd.

In 1991, Thomson-CSF acquired 50% of Pilkington Optronics. In 1995 Pilkington Optronics acquired Thorn EMI Electro Optics which was renamed Pilkington Thorn Optronics. Three years later, Thomson-CSF purchased another 40% of Pilkington Optronics from Pilkington and the remainder in 2000 to make it a wholly owned subsidiary. In 2000 Thomson-CSF was renamed Thales and Pilkington Optronics Ltd. became Thales Optronics Ltd. Soon after, Thomson-CSF acquired W Vinten Ltd, a British reconnaissance equipment manufacturer, including the Joint Reconnaissance Pod.

In November 2006, Thales Optronics Limited announced the closure of its manufacturing facility in Taunton, Somerset, with the loss of 180 jobs. In June 2007 Thales sold the beryllium mirrors (used for astronomy) and structures business of Thales Optronics Limited to GSI Group Inc. for an undisclosed amount.

Thales Optronics Limited was awarded the Queen's Award for Enterprise in June 2011.

== Operations ==
=== United Kingdom ===
Thales Optronics Limited has its headquarters and main production facility in Glasgow, Scotland, where it employs around 630 people. Its principal activity is the design, development and manufacture of infra-red cameras, laser range-finders, and cameras for use in airborne reconnaissance systems, armoured vehicle sighting systems, submarine periscopes and target locators.

In 2011, Thales Optronics Limited generated total revenues of £229 million (2010 – £212 million) and profits of £24.4 million (2010 – £14 million).

== Products ==
- Search and track
  - PIRATE (Passive Infra Red Airborne Tracking Equipment) for Eurofighter Typhoon
  - Rafale FSO/OSF IRST systems
- IRST systems
- Self protection systems
  - Laser Warning Receivers
  - Laser countermeasures
- Laser range finders
- Sighting systems
- Reconnaissance systems
  - Joint Reconnaissance Pod
- Submarine Sensor Systems including the latest non-hull penetrating Optronics Masts systems, which replace conventional periscopes in some of the most modern submarine classes.
- Electro-optic aircraft reconnaissance pods and image exploitation stations
- AFV Fire Control and Navigation systems

== See also ==
- Aerospace industry in the United Kingdom
