= Antony Pilkington =

British Businessman

Sir Antony Richard Pilkington (20 June 1935 – 22 September 2000) was the fifth generation and last family member to chair the Pilkington group.

== Business career ==
He succeeded distant cousin Sir Alastair Pilkington as chairman in 1980 and served until 1995, having joined the board in 1973 when his second cousin once removed Baron Pilkington retired as chairman. He wanted Pilkington’s to be a “good company in the best sense,” as he told one interviewer in 1990, “not just a money machine”.

He was knighted in 1990.

== Family ==
Son of Major Arthur Cope Pilkington, he attended Ampleforth College and went on to spend his National service in the Coldstream Guards.

He married Alice Kirsty Dundas, daughter of Major Sir Thomas Calderwood Dundas of Arniston (7th baronet) and Isobel Goring, on 15 December 1960. They had four children:

- Jerome Antony Simon Pilkington b. 17 Sep 1961
- David Christopher Pilkington b. 4 Dec 1963
- Miranda Kirsty Pilkington b. 20 Sep 1966
- Simon Benedict Pilkington b. 9 Dec 1972

== The World of Glass ==
He was known as a great supporter of the town that had made his family name (and fortune). As chairman of the World of Glass, he oversaw the plans for a new visitor centre in St Helens, combining the history of glass and of the town itself. The museum opened in March 2000, just six months before his death.

At the official opening, he said:

”We always knew that the history of glass and St Helens part in the glass making industry was a great story to tell, but it was deciding on which was the best way to relate that story.

“Now we have got the story of the town's heritage and the important part it played in the glass making industry under one roof. It's taken nine years for The World of Glass to come to fruition but it's been well worth the effort.

"St Helens has got a lot to be proud of in its heritage and in this new centre."

== Tribute ==
Commenting on the news of Pilkington’s death, a spokesperson for the firm of which he had been Chairman, said:

”Everyone at Pilkington is aware of the contribution Sir Antony made to the development of the company over such a long career. His role in the expansion of Pilkington globally was particularly significant."

His antique car collection (a passion shared with his uncle) was auctioned at the 2012 Goodwood Festival of Speed. The five cars offered (Lots 217-221) exceeded the 800,000GBP pre-auction estimate.

MP Sir Richard Pilkington was his uncle, with whom he shared a passion for cars.
