= Pilkington =

British glass manufacturer

Pilkington Group Limited
- Company type: Subsidiary to Nippon Sheet Glass of Japan
- Industry: Glassmaking
- Founded: 1826 (St Helens)
- Founder: William Pilkington
- Headquarters: Lathom, Lancashire, England
- Number of locations: 22 sites in the UK
- Products: Glass and glazing solutions for automotive and architectural.
- Owner: Nippon Sheet Glass
- Parent: NSG Group
- Website: www.pilkington.com

Pilkington is a glass-manufacturing company based in Lathom, Lancashire, England. It includes several legal entities in the UK, and is a subsidiary of the Japanese company Nippon Sheet Glass (NSG). It was formerly an independent company listed on the London Stock Exchange and a constituent of the FTSE 100 Index.

Established in 1826 as the St Helens Crown Glass Company, the company gradually grew to become the largest employer in St Helens, where it was originally based. It was renamed Pilkington Brothers in 1845 following the ending of the partnership with the Greenall family. The business continued to expand, becoming Pilkington Brothers Limited after its incorporation in 1894. In 1903, it became the sole British manufacturer of plate glass as well as the dominant producer of sheet glass. After the First World War, Pilkington was one of only two large glass manufacturers remaining in Britain, the other being Chance Brothers; the firm gradually expanded its stake in Chance and fully acquired it in 1951.

Pilkington performed strongly during the Second World War, fulfilling all wartime demands and emerged in a relatively strong position after the war's end. During the 1950s, Pilkington employees Alastair Pilkington (no relation) and Kenneth Bickerstaff invented the float glass process; the firm leveraged licensing agreements for many other manufacturers to use this new process in exchange for royalty payments. Throughout the 1960s and 1970s, Pilkington invested heavily into its manufacturing sites and acquired numerous overseas competitors. It also became a major world supplier of toughened and laminated safety glass via its controlling interest in Triplex Safety Glass.

During 1970, Pilkington was floated as a public company on the London Stock Exchange; prior to this, the firm had been owned by a combination of descendants of the Pilkington family and several employee trusts. In late 1985, Pilkington was the subject of a hostile takeover bid from BTR Industries which it successfully warded off. During the 1990s, amid allegations that Pilkington had organised a cartel due to its hold on the float glass market, the US government and Pilkington filed a proposed consent decree that released other businesses from several licensing terms. In late 2005, the company received an initial takeover bid from NSG; a second and more generous bid was accepted by Pilkington's key shareholders. The acquisition was completed during June 2006; the combined company has since competed for global leadership of the glass industry.

== History ==
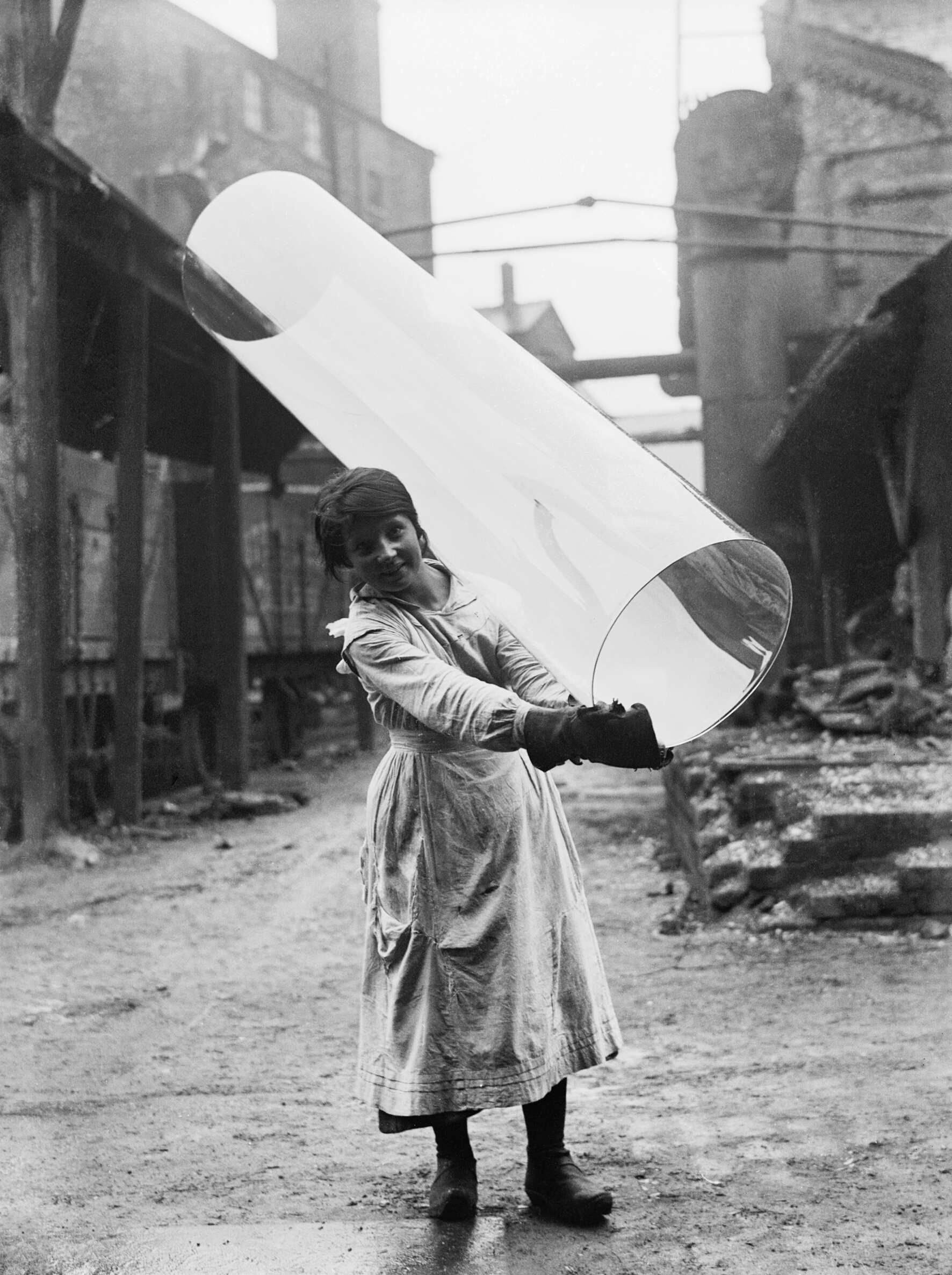
A factory worker holding a cylinder of sheet glass, 1918

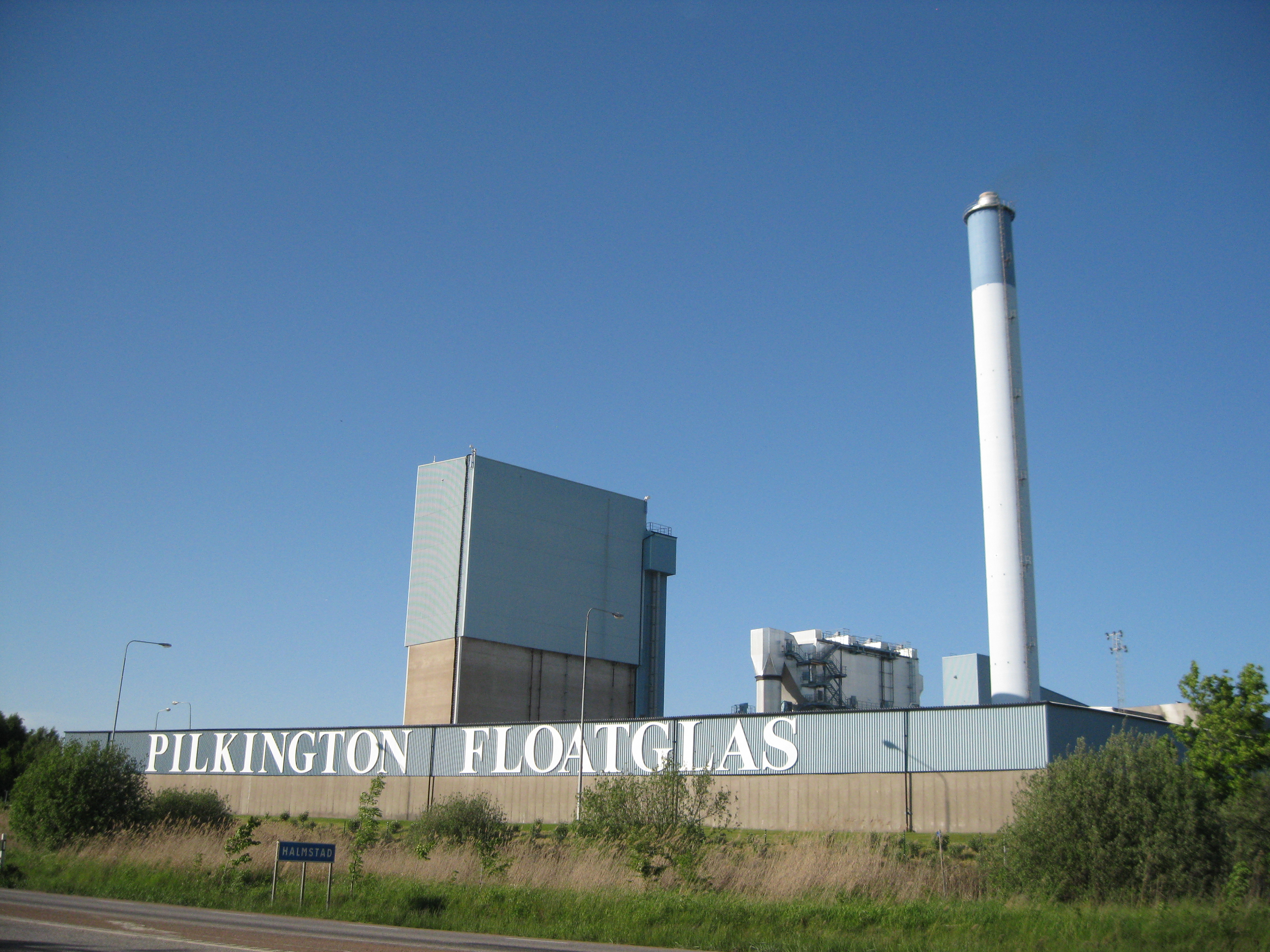
Pilkington Floatglass former factory in Halmstad, Sweden. Closed since 2012.

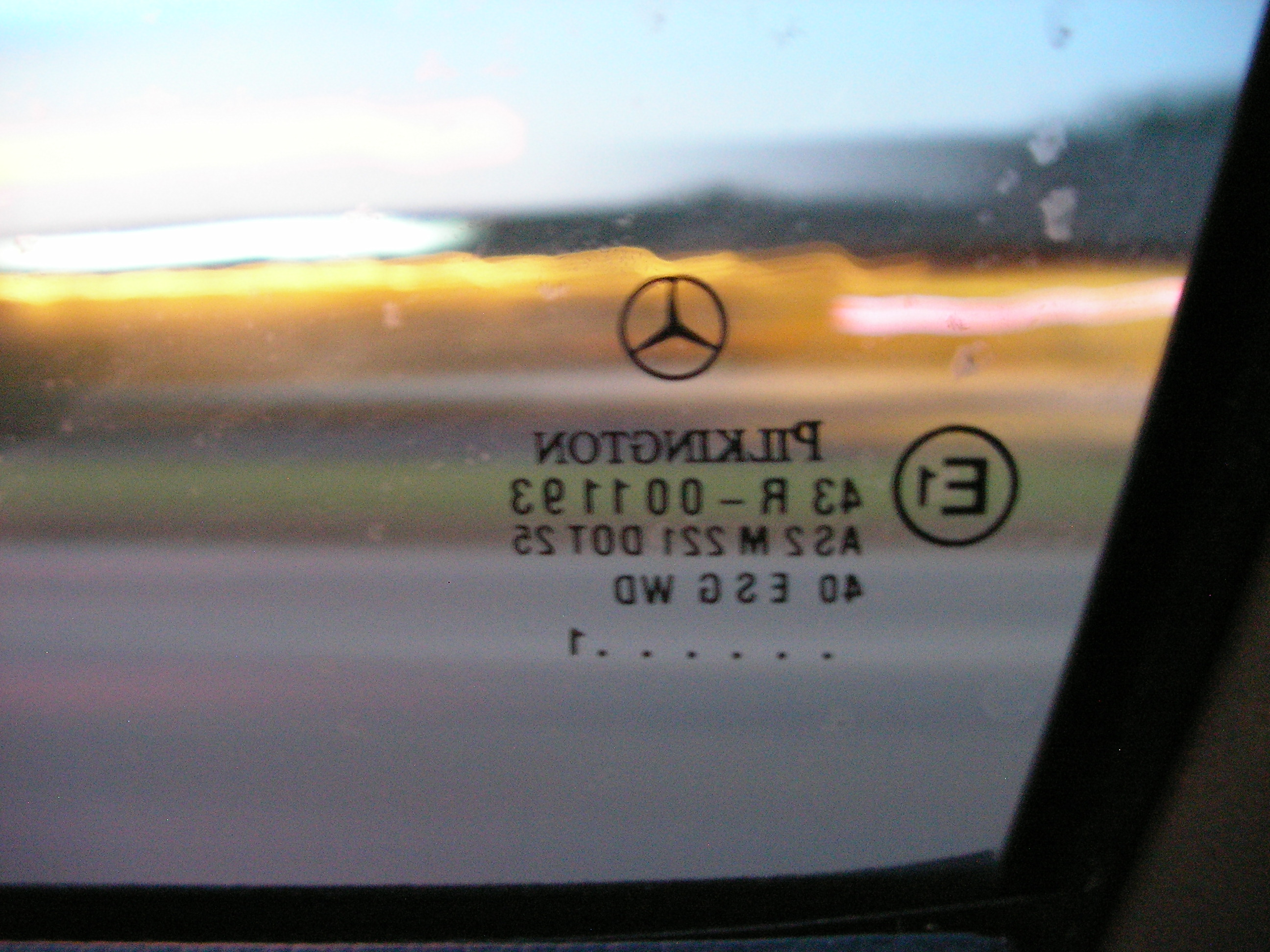
Pilkington glass in a Mercedes-Benz

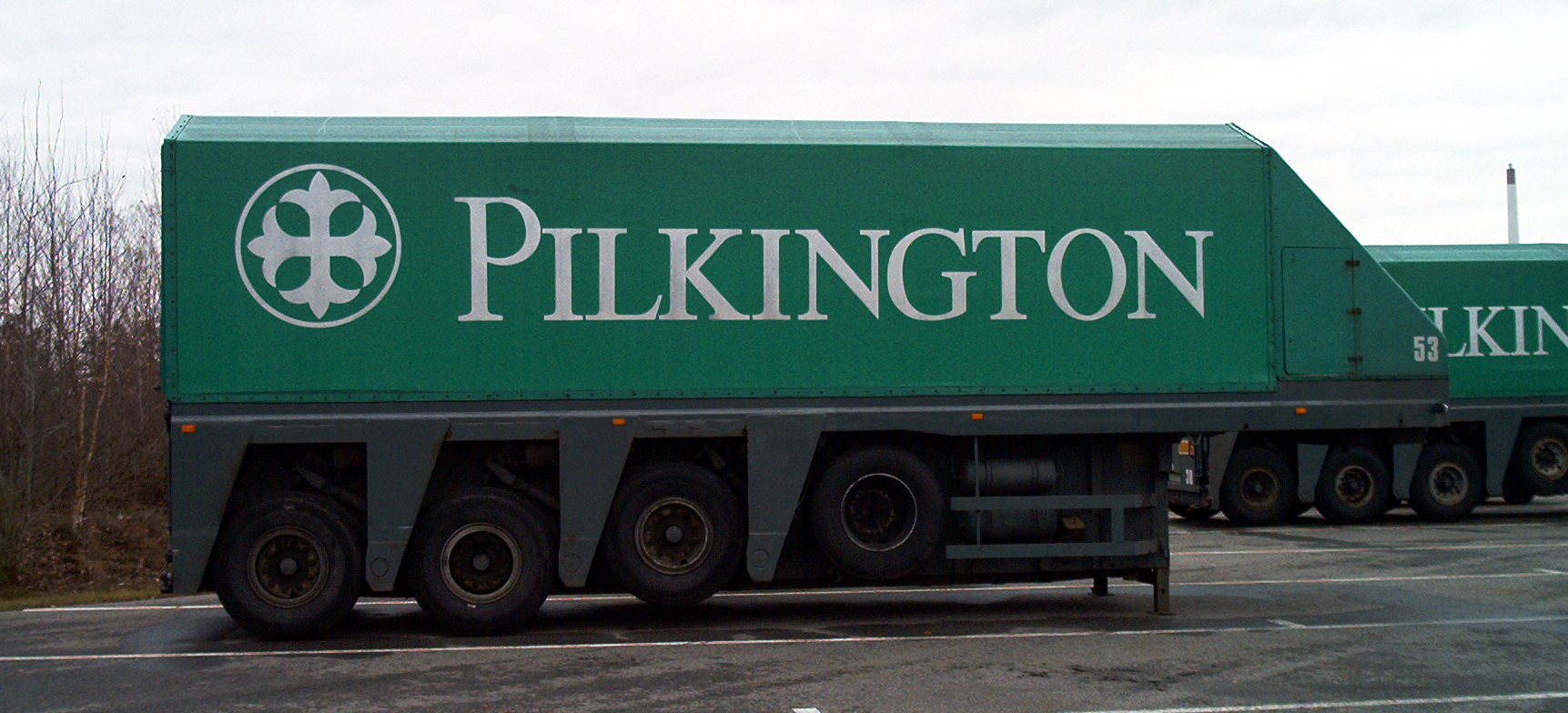
A trailer with Pilkington livery

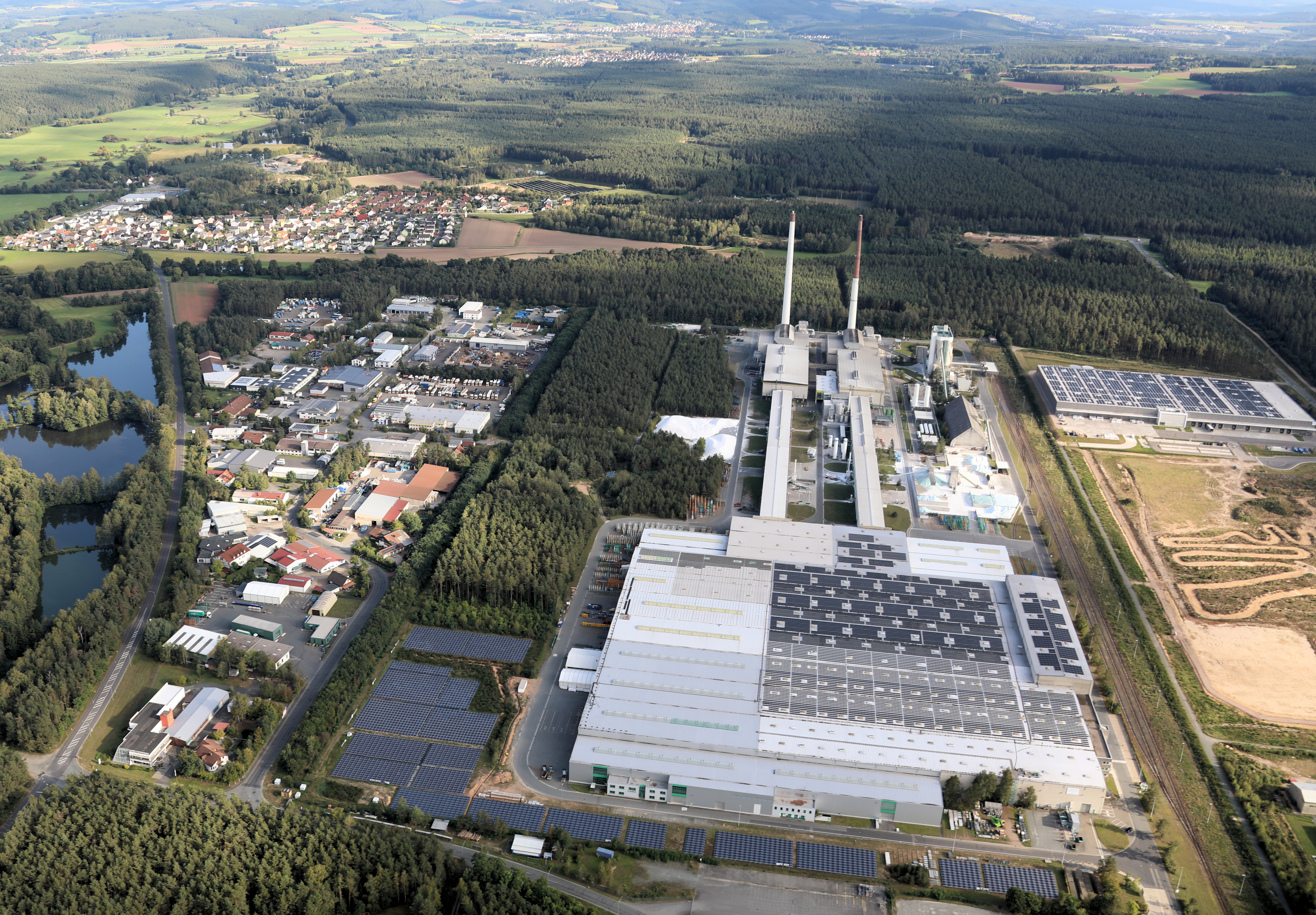
Pilkington Floatglass former factory in Weiherhammer, Germany 2023

The company was founded in 1826 as a partnership between members of the Pilkington and Greenall families, based in St Helens, Lancashire, England. The venture used the trading name of St Helens Crown Glass Company. The company grew to become the biggest employer in St Helens. The distinctive blue-glass head office tower block on Alexandra Business Park, off Prescot Road, originally used as the firm's world headquarters, and completed in 1964, still dominates the town's skyline.

Following the departure from the partnership of the last Greenall in 1845, the firm was renamed as Pilkington Brothers. During 1894, the business was incorporated under the Companies Act 1862 as Pilkington Brothers Limited. In 1903, it became the sole British manufacturer of plate glass as well as the dominant producer of sheet glass.

Throughout the first half of the twentieth century, the company struck a series of market agreements with various domestic and European glass manufacturers of varying effectiveness. European competitors, particularly those based in Belgium, had applied considerable competitive pressure to Britain's glass making industry; Pilkington was less susceptible due to a strong focus on exports and international developments throughout the British Empire and South America. The company also invested heavily into its manufacturing capabilities, such as a new plate glass works outside Doncaster in 1922, and introduced new production techniques.

After the First World War, Pilkington was one of only two large glass manufacturers remaining in Britain, the other being Chance Brothers, which mostly produced cast glass. The two companies formed various agreements during the interwar period to share the domestic market and to not undercut each other; furthermore, Pilkington agreed to purchase any shares in the firm that Chance's owners wished to sell, thus it gradually built up a sizable stake in the firm. In 1951, Chance became wholly owned by Pilkington.

Pilkington found itself in a relatively strong position in the aftermath of the Second World War, having exclusively fulfilled Britain's wartime requirements and even managing to expand its export activities. While there was no reintroduction of the pre-war quota arrangements and its historic undertakings with individual merchants were abandoned during 1950, the company still entered an export agreement with its competitors in the European mainland. Further reforms to its business practices were made in response to the enactment of the Restrictive Trade Practices Act 1956.

Between 1953 and 1957, the employees Alastair Pilkington (no relation) and Kenneth Bickerstaff invented the float glass process, a revolutionary method of high-quality flat glass production by floating molten glass over a bath of molten tin, avoiding the costly need to grind and polish plate glass to make it clear. Pilkington allowed the float process to be used under licence by numerous manufacturers around the world. Amongst other benefits, these licensing arrangements often helped the company to further its interests, including the expansion of its presence in the European market and even gaining stakes in other manufacturers.

During the 1960s and 1970s, Pilkington used the flow of float royalty payments to finance its investments in float glass plants across several countries, including Argentina, Australia, Canada and Sweden, and also to acquire major existing flat and safety glass producers and plants in the United States (Libbey Owens Ford), Germany and France. Pilkington, with its subsidiary Triplex Safety Glass, in which it gradually acquired a controlling interest, also became a major world supplier of toughened and laminated safety glass to the automotive, aerospace and building industries.

A Monopolies Commission report in 1967, concluded that Pilkington and Triplex operations were efficient and entrepreneurial and, despite their high share of the UK glass trade, operated in a manner suited to consumers' best interests. At the time, the majority of the company's shareholding was largely in the hands of various descendants of the original owners or employee trusts. In 1970, Pilkington was floated as a public company on the London Stock Exchange.

A rank-and-file strike during 1970, sparked off by an error in wage packets, brought 8,000 workers out for nearly two months. The General and Municipal Workers Union and Trades Union Congress leadership failed to provide any support, as they were too closely bound to management and government circles, with the result that strike leaders were blacklisted. Anti-union legislation was introduced by central government. These events were recreated in Ken Loach's film The Rank and File, although the BBC insisted on a change in the name and location of the company, so that the film is set at a fictitious "Wilkinsons" factory in the Midlands.

In late 1985, Pilkington was the subject of a hostile takeover bid from BTR Industries, a large British-based conglomerate group, which valued the company at $1.64 billion. Pilington's management rejected the offer and fought a successful defensive campaign in which various politicians took sides in the matter, thus BTR was compelled to withdraw its offer in February 1987.

=== Litigation ===
Pilkington aggressively protected its patents and trade secrets through a network of licensing agreements with glass manufacturers around the world. The modern "float" technique (pouring the molten glass on a layer of very pure molten tin) became commercially widespread when Alastair Pilkington developed a practical version, patented in the late 1950s and early 1960s. As Pilkington plc owned all but one of the manufacturing plants around the world employing the float process, Pilkington had a monopoly.

Although the patents had expired by the early 1980s, Pilkington had licensed their use, and required the licensees to keep the details of the float glass process secret. Guardian Industries had tried to challenge Pilkington's dominance but had made a secret agreement to prevent new entrants into the market, with Guardian taking the lead to enable Pilkington, a British company, to reduce its exposure to United States antitrust law.

In May 1994, the United States Department of Justice filed suit on the grounds that Pilkington had created a cartel by exercising control over the markets in which its licensees could sell float glass and construct float-glass manufacturing plants, and over the customers within each market to which each licensee could serve. It was claimed this was a violation of the Sherman Antitrust Act, because Pilkington's patents had expired and any trade secrets which it might have had in the process used by the licensees had long since become publicly known. On the same day, the US government and Pilkington filed a proposed consent decree, which enjoined Pilkington from enforcing these restrictions against its US licensees, or against US non-licensees, or against non-US licensees wishing to export either technology or glass products to the United States. The agreement came into force on 22 December 1994, and expired ten years later.

During 2008, the European Commission imposed a fine of €357 million on Pilkington, along with three other glass manufacturers, for its part in a five-year price-fixing scheme used in car windscreens.

=== Pilkington Optronics ===
In 1988, Pilkington plc formed a new subsidiary, Pilkington Optronics, in order to group together the company's optronics businesses: Pilkington PE located in North Wales (formed in 1966), and Barr and Stroud (acquired in 1977) which was based in Glasgow. Pilkington PE later became Thales Optics Ltd., which was divested from Thales in December 2005 as Qioptiq Ltd.

Thomson-CSF acquired 50% of Pilkington Optronics in 1991. In 1995, Pilkington Optronics acquired Thorn EMI Electro Optics which was renamed Pilkington Thorn Optronics. Three years later, Thomson-CSF purchased another 40% of Pilkington Optronics from Pilkington and the remainder in 2000 to make it a wholly owned subsidiary. In 2000, Thomson-CSF was renamed Thales and Pilkington Optronics Ltd. became Thales Optronics Ltd. Soon afterward, Thomson-CSF acquired W Vinten Ltd, a British reconnaissance equipment manufacturer, including the Joint Reconnaissance Pod, who now operate as Thales Optronics (Bury St Edmunds) Ltd.

In November 2006, Thales Optronics Limited announced the closure of its manufacturing facility in Taunton, Somerset, with the loss of 180 jobs. In June 2007, Thales sold the beryllium mirrors and structures business of Thales Optronics Limited to GSI Group Inc. for an undisclosed amount.

=== Takeover by NSG ===
In late 2005, the company received a takeover bid from a bigger Japanese company, NSG, which had previously built up a 20 percent stake in the business by 2002. The initial bid and the first revised bid were not accepted, however, on 16 February 2006, NSG increased its offer for the 80 percent it did not already own to 165 pence per share (£1.8 billion or $3.14 billion in total) and this was accepted by Pilkington's major institutional shareholders, enabling NSG to compulsorily acquire by scheme of arrangement the smaller holdings of other shareholders, many of them being existing and retired employees, who had not wished to support the takeover. The combined company would compete for global leadership in the glass industry with the leading Japanese glassmaker Asahi Glass, which had around a quarter of the global market at the time of the deal. Pilkington had 19% and NSG around half that.

The acquisition was completed in June 2006, after the European Commission stated that it would not be opposed. At the time of the merger, Pilkington and NSG had been the second- and third-largest glass manufacturers in the world, respectively.

=== Chairmen ===
An incomplete list:

- 1914–1921: Arthur Richard Pilkington (1871–1921)
- 1921–1931: Richard Austin Pilkington (1871–1951)
- 1932–1949: Geoffrey Langton Pilkington (1885–1972)
- 1949–1973: Baron Pilkington (1905–1983)
- 1973–1980: Sir Alastair Pilkington (1920–1995)
- 1980–1995: Sir Antony Pilkington (1935–2000)
- 1995–2006: Sir Nigel Rudd (born 1946)

== Operations ==
Pilkington has developed a self-cleaning coated float glass product, called Pilkington Activ. This self-cleaning glass has a coating which uses a method of photocatalysis to break down organic dirt with sunlight. The dirt is then washed away by the rain during a hydrophilic process.

== Australia and New Zealand ==
Pilkington started an Australian operation in Geelong in 1856, initially importing glass from the UK. They established an Australian factory to make laminated glass at 265 Melbourne Road, North Geelong in 1936.

In 1972, Pilkington's established Australia's first float glass production line at Dandenong in a joint venture with Australian Consolidated Industries.

In 2006, CSR acquired the Australian and New Zealand Pilkington's operations from NSG, merged it with DMS Glass, and rebranded to Viridian Glass. During late 2018, CSR sold Viridian to the private equity firm Crescent. Viridian acquired SOLOS Glass in 2021.
