= Nippon Sheet Glass =

Japanese Glass Manufacturer

Nippon Sheet Glass Co., Ltd. 日本板硝子株式会社
- Type: Public KK
- Traded as: TYO: 5202
- Industry: Glass
- Founded: Osaka, Japan (November 22, 1918; 107 years ago)
- Headquarters: Sumitomo Fudosan Tokyo Mita South Tower, 5-27, Mita 3-Chome, Minato-ku, Tokyo 108-6321, Japan
- Key people: Munehiro Hosonuma (Representative Executive Officer, President and CEO)
- Products: Architectural glass; Automotive glass; Technical glass (Creative Technology)
- Revenue: ¥ 832.537 billion (FY 2024 March)
- Net income: ¥ 10.633 billion (FY 2024 March)
- Number of employees: 25,356 (as of March 31, 2024)
- Website: Official website

Nippon Sheet Glass Co., Ltd. (日本板硝子株式会社, Nihon Ita-Garasu Kabushiki-gaisha) is a Japanese glass manufacturing company. In 2006, it acquired Pilkington of the United Kingdom. This makes NSG/Pilkington one of the four largest glass companies in the world alongside another Japanese company Asahi Glass, Saint-Gobain, and Guardian Industries.

The company was delisted from the Tokyo Stock Exchange on September 30th, 2026.

== History ==
The company was established in November 1918 as America Japan Sheet Glass Co., Ltd. with its head office in Osaka, after it obtained technology from Libbey Owens Ford Glass Co. of the United States to produce flat glass using the Colburn process. The company changed its name to the Nippon Sheet Glass Co., Ltd. in January 1931. It expanded operations across Japan post World War II, and in October 1970, acquired Nippon Safety Glass Co., Ltd. In April 1999, the company merged with Nippon Glass Fiber Co., Ltd. and Micro Optics Co., Ltd. In April 2001, the company acquired Nippon Muki Co., Ltd. and in July 2004, moved the registered head office from Osaka to Minato Ward in Tokyo.

=== Pilkington ===
In 1986, Pilkington bought Libbey Owens Ford. Following an agreed acquisition of 20% of Pilkington of the United Kingdom in 2001, in 2006, NSG purchased the remaining 80% of shares.

=== Present ===
Founded in 1918, NSG acquired the leading UK-based glass manufacturer Pilkington plc in June 2006. Today, the company has combined sales of approximately JPY 800 billion, with manufacturing operations in 29 countries and sales in 130 countries, employing some 25 thousand people worldwide.

The Group's Flat Glass businesses, encompassing Building Products and Automotive Products, account for 90 per cent of annual sales, with the balance being in Technical Glass (Creative Technology Business). The Creative Technology business covers a number of niche markets, including lenses for printers and scanners, specialty glass fibers and glass flakes, mainly glass cord, which is a reinforcing material for timing belts, and Fine Glass products.

Geographically, approximately 40 per cent of the Group's sales are in Europe, 25 per cent in Asia including Japan and 35 per cent in North America and South America.

In March 2026, funds affiliated with Apollo Global Management agreed to acquire Nippon Sheet Glass through a capital restructuring that included a ¥165 billion share issue. The share issue was completed on 31 August, and the company said its shares were scheduled to leave the Tokyo Stock Exchange on 28 September 2026.

=== Main products in Japan ===
NSG TEC solar energy products, technical glass for white goods and displays

=== Home use ===
- SPACIA: Double glazing with vacuum layer at center plane. (Eco-Glass)
- SECUO: Security glass as laminated glass with resin sheet.
- PAIR REIBORG: Double glazing, sunshading and high-thermal insulating glass with special metal coating. (Eco-Glass)
- PAIR REIBORG HIKARI: Photocatalytic cleaning glass with REIBORG. (Eco-Glass)
- HOME TOUGH LIGHT: Toughened glass with 5 times toughness as normal glass.

=== Building use ===
- UMU: Electric controlled switching glass with transparent or photo scattered.

=== Telecom・IT use ===
- SELFOC: Flat-end-type Rod lens with graded index by ion exchange (self focus)
- SLA SELFOC LENS ARRAY: Arrayed Selfoc lens for scanning image like a copy-machine or printer.

=== Automobile use ===
- LAMIPANE: Laminated glass for windshield.
- THERLITE-T: Heater line installed Anti-fogging glass.
