= Digital Joint Reconnaissance Pod =

The Digital Joint Reconnaissance Pod (or DJRP) is a wide area tactical aerial reconnaissance pod produced by Thales Optronics of Bury St Edmunds, England. It is a later version of a pod produced for the UKMoD and the RAF Jaguar force, originally developed and produced by W. Vinten Ltd. The original designation of the pod was Jaguar Replacement Reconnaissance Pod (JRRP) and after successfully entering service in the 1990s it was subsequently redesignated DJRP, and fitted to a wide range of other aircraft.

The current sensors are an 8042 EO sensor and a Super Vigil IR sensor; these feed digital data to two recording modules which provide storage. The pod functions are controlled by a reconnaissance management system, enabling both pre-planned and pilot-initiated events to be recorded. The sensors are configured to provide wide area coverage; the EO sensor records at both long and short range, providing a stand-off capability, while the IR sensor records a horizon-to-horizon image based on the aircraft's flightpath. The recorded data is either downloaded from the recording modules after flight, or can be called up by ground stations via a datalink.

Along with the Networked Imagery Exploitation System (NIES), the system provides high resolution tactical reconnaissance imagery, has been used in Operation Telic and provided reconnaissance capability to British forces in Afghanistan. The equipment has also been exported.

The DJRP was integrated onto the Saab Gripen for the South African Air Force.
