= List of defunct glassmaking companies =

This is a list of defunct glassmaking companies, which are no longer in business.

== Defunct glassmaking companies ==
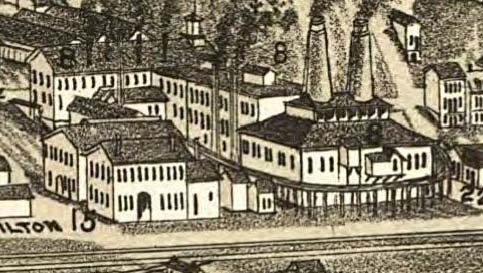
1882 drawing of the Belmont Glass Works

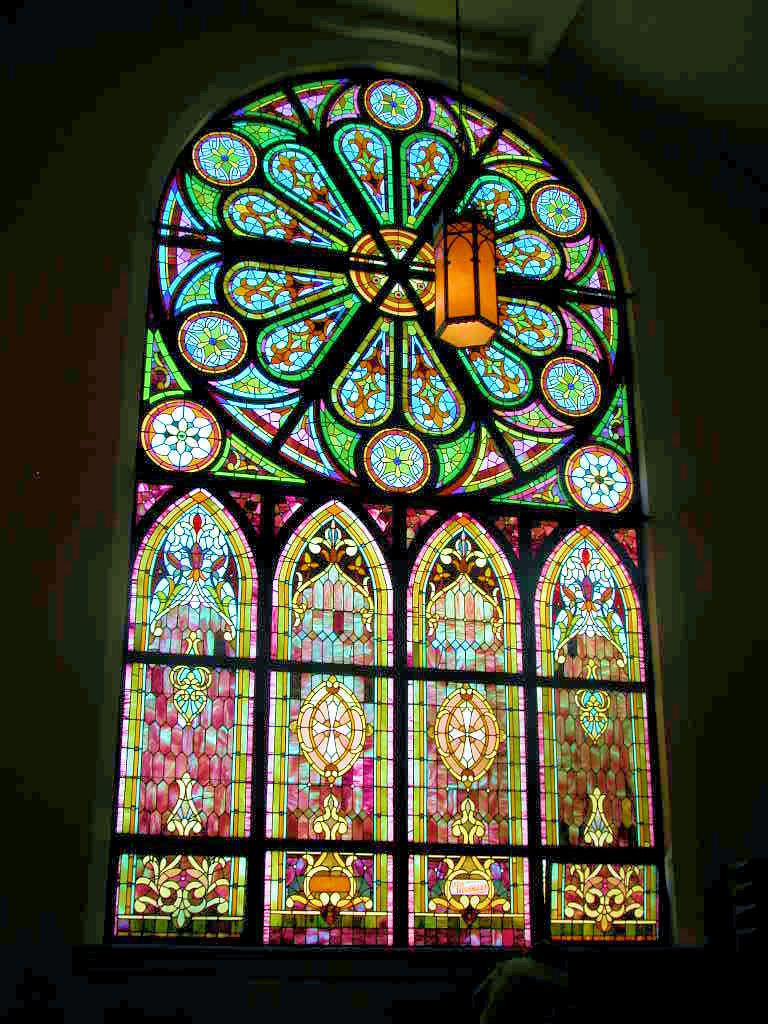
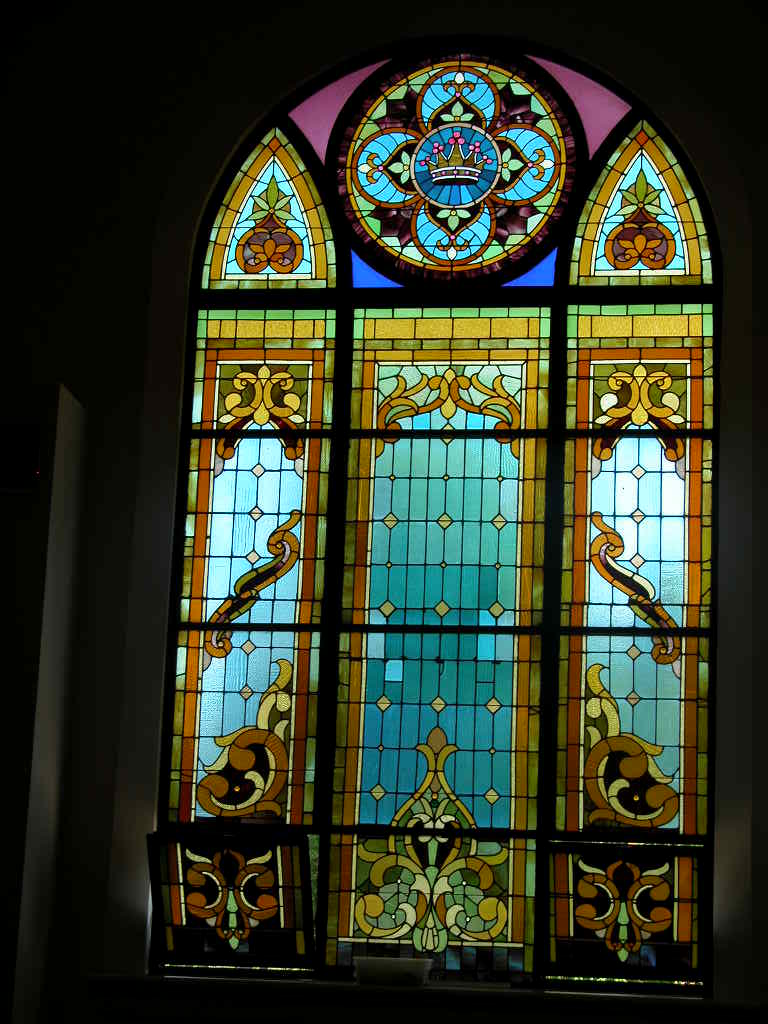
Two large stained-glass windows installed by Hartford City Glass Company's Belgian glass workers

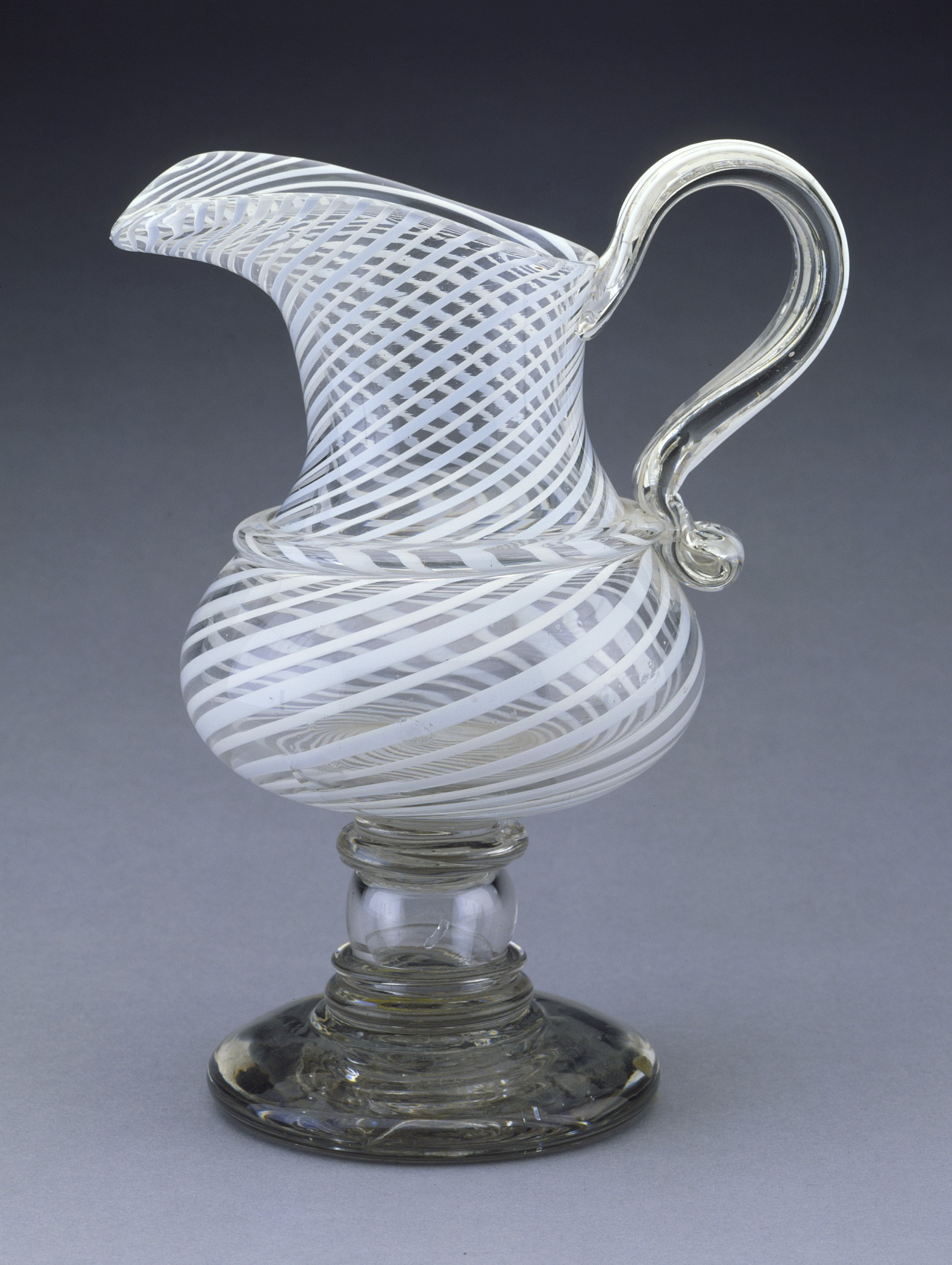
A New England Glass Company ewer, 1840–1860

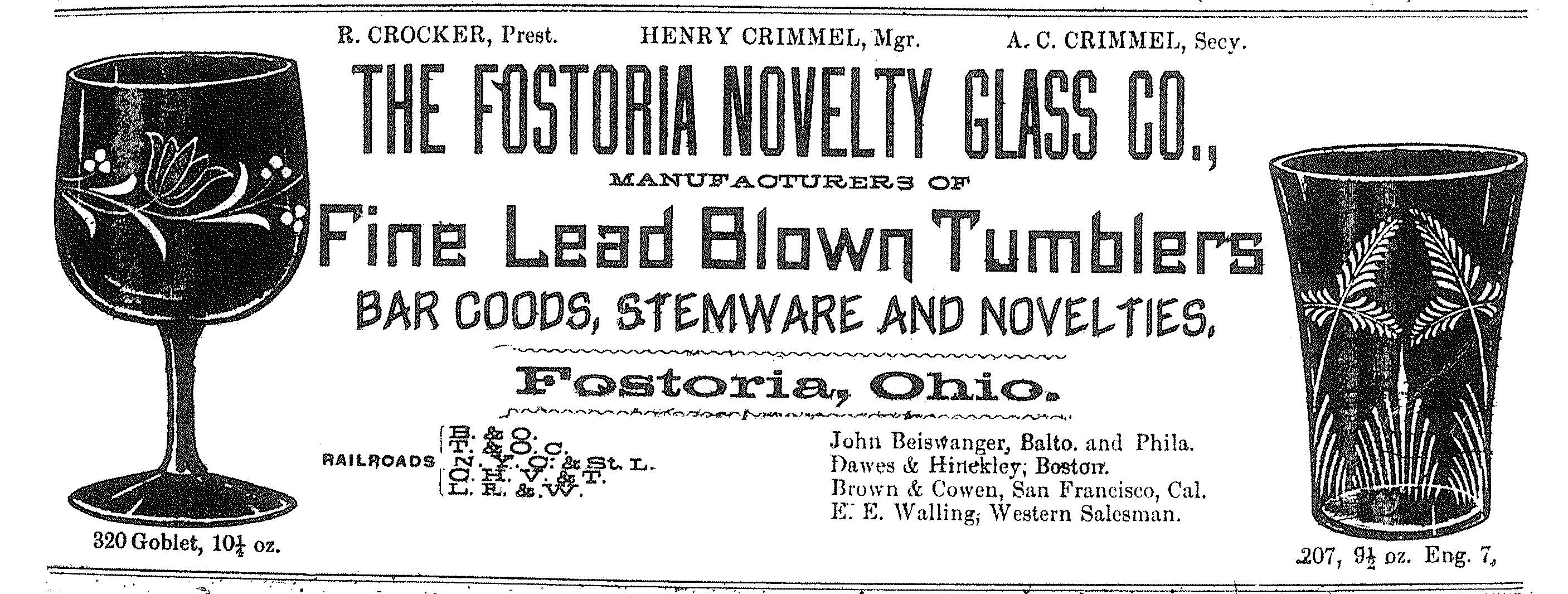
A Novelty Glass Company advertisement in 1891

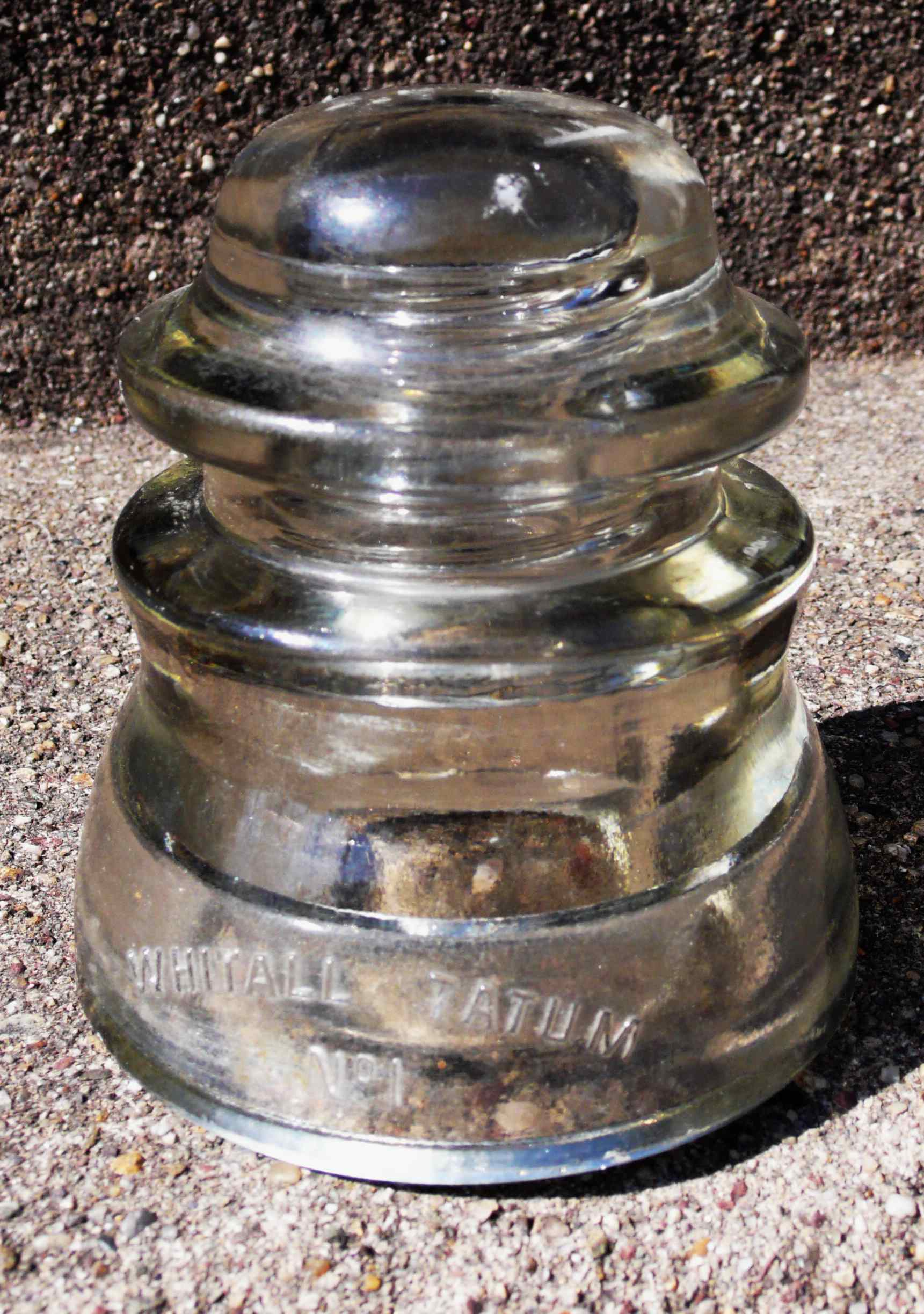
An electrical insulator made by Whitall Tatum Company, circa 1922

- Alexander Gibbs
- An Túr Gloine
- Appert Frères
- Bakewell, Pears and Company (company had numerous names)
- Bellaire Goblet Company
- Belmont Glass Works (not the English company established in 1805)
- Boston and Sandwich Glass Company
- Brockway Glass Company
- Brookfield Glass Company
- Cambridge Glass
- Carr Lowrey Glass Company
- Chance Brothers
- Chandos Glass Cone
- Cheshire Crown Glass Company
- Clayton and Bell
- Crystal City, Missouri
- Dugan Glass Company
- Dunbar Glass
- Duncan & Miller Glass Company
- Earley and Company
- Edward Ford Plate Glass Company
- Fenton Glass Company
- Fostoria Glass Company
- Fostoria Shade and Lamp Company
- General Glass Industries
- Goddard & Gibbs
- Grönvik glasbruk
- Hartford City Glass Company
- Hazel-Atlas Glass Company
- Heisey Glass Company
- Helio (Cambridge Glass)
- Hemingray Glass Company
- Indiana Glass Company
- J. H. Hobbs, Brockunier and Company
- James Powell and Sons
- Jersey Glass Company
- Kastrup Glasværk
- Knox Glass Bottle Company
- Lancaster Glass Company
- Lavers, Barraud and Westlake
- Louisville Glassworks
- Macbeth-Evans Glass Company
- Mambourg Glass Company
- Manufacture royale de glaces de miroirs
- Millersburg Glass Company
- Morris & Co.
- Nailsea Glassworks
- New England Glass Company
- New England Glassworks
- New Geneva Glass Works
- Nickel Plate Glass Company
- Northwood Glass Company
- Novelty Glass Company
- Old Dominion Glass Company
- Pitkin Glassworks
- Pittsburgh Plate Glass Enamel Plant
- Ravenhead Glass
- The Root Glass Company
- Seneca Glass Company
- Shrigley and Hunt
- Sneath Glass Company
- Stevens & Williams
- Thames Plate Glass Company
- Union Glass Company
- W. F. Clokey of Belfast
- Ward & Company of London
- Ward and Hughes
- Ward & Partners of Belfast
- Westmoreland Glass Company
- Whitall Tatum Company
- White Glass Company
- Whitefriars Glass
- Wistarburg Glass Works

== See also ==
- Lists of companies – company-related list articles on Wikipedia
