= Duncan & Miller Glass Company =

American glass manufacturing company

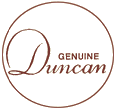
- Company type: Partnership (1865-1900); Corporation (1900-1955)
- Industry: Glass manufacturing
- Predecessor: Ripley & Company
- Founded: 1865
- Founder: George Duncan
- Defunct: June 13, 1955
- Fate: Dissolved
- Successor: United States Glass Company
- Headquarters: Washington, Pennsylvania
- Number of employees: 200 (1908)

Duncan & Miller Glass Company was a well-known glass manufacturing company in Washington, Pennsylvania. Items that were produced by the company are known as "Duncan glass" or "Duncan Miller glass." The company was founded in 1865 by George Duncan with his two sons and son-in-law in the South Side neighborhood of Pittsburgh, Pennsylvania. By 1890, the company joined other glass companies to form the United States Glass Company, a powerful glass trust. In 1892, the factory was destroyed in a fire, and the company was relieved of its trust relationship with the US Glass Company. After the fire, the second generation of the Duncan family moved operations to Washington, Pennsylvania. In 1900, John Ernest Miller, the company's long-time designer, became a full shareholder along with members of the Duncan family. By 1955, economic pressures from machine-produced glass forced the company to sell off its assets to the US Glass Company, who continued to produce Duncan-style glass until 1980.

== History ==
In 1865, George Duncan purchased the Ripley & Company glass factory at 10th and Carson Streets in the South Side neighborhood of Pittsburgh, Pennsylvania from D.C. Ripley, a former business partner of Duncan. The factory was located adjacent to the Monongahela River, which provided easy access to transportation. A new company, George Duncan & Sons, was formed by Duncan, his sons Harry B. Duncan and James E. Duncan, and Augustus H. Heisey, who was married to George's daughter Susan. In 1874, John Ernest Miller, a 20-year veteran of the glass manufacturing industry, joined the company as a designer. He was previously the foreman of the mould shop at King, Son and Company. The addition of Miller proved to be fortuitous, because Miller's designs over the next 52 years became internationally famous. In 1877, George Duncan died and James E. Duncan took control of the company.

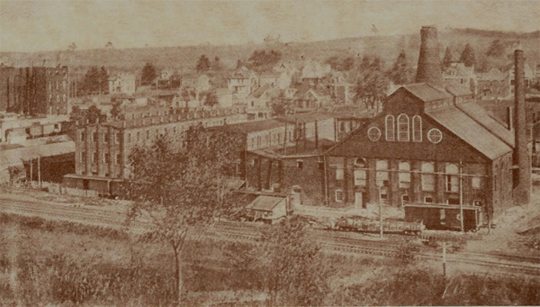
Duncan & Miller Glass Company location in Washington, Pennsylvania.

In 1890, the United States Glass Company formed a glass trust that included the George Duncan & Sons operation. In 1892, their factory was destroyed by fire, relieving the company of their trust relationship. After the fire, son-in-law Augustus Heisey left the company to begin his own glass manufacturing operation in Newark, Ohio. James E. Duncan built a new factory on Jefferson Avenue in Washington, Pennsylvania, where access to railroads was convenient, and the natural gas which was needed to power the furnaces was inexpensive. Construction of the plant, which featured a 16 Pot Deep Eye furnace, was finished on January 3, 1893. The first pattern produced in the new facility was the well-known Mitchell pattern. The new operation was named George Duncan's Sons & Co.

On November 15, 1900, after James Duncan's death, the firm was officially incorporated as Duncan and Miller Glass Company, with John Ernest Miller joining the Duncan family as stockholders. The company abruptly ceased operations on June 13, 1955. By then, modern assembly lines and glassmaking machinery caused hand made glass to be uneconomical. The remaining inventory was sold at greatly reduced prices, causing glass collectors to travel hundreds of miles to purchase the final pieces. The molds and equipment were sold to the US Glass Company, where their Duncan Division in Tiffin, Ohio continued to produce Duncan-ware pieces. A number of Duncan employees also joined US Glass Company in Tiffin. The Duncan factory was sold to Andy Bros., but before they could move in, a fire destroyed the building on June 29, 1956. Production of the Duncan-ware glass ceased in 1980.

== Duncan craftsmanship ==
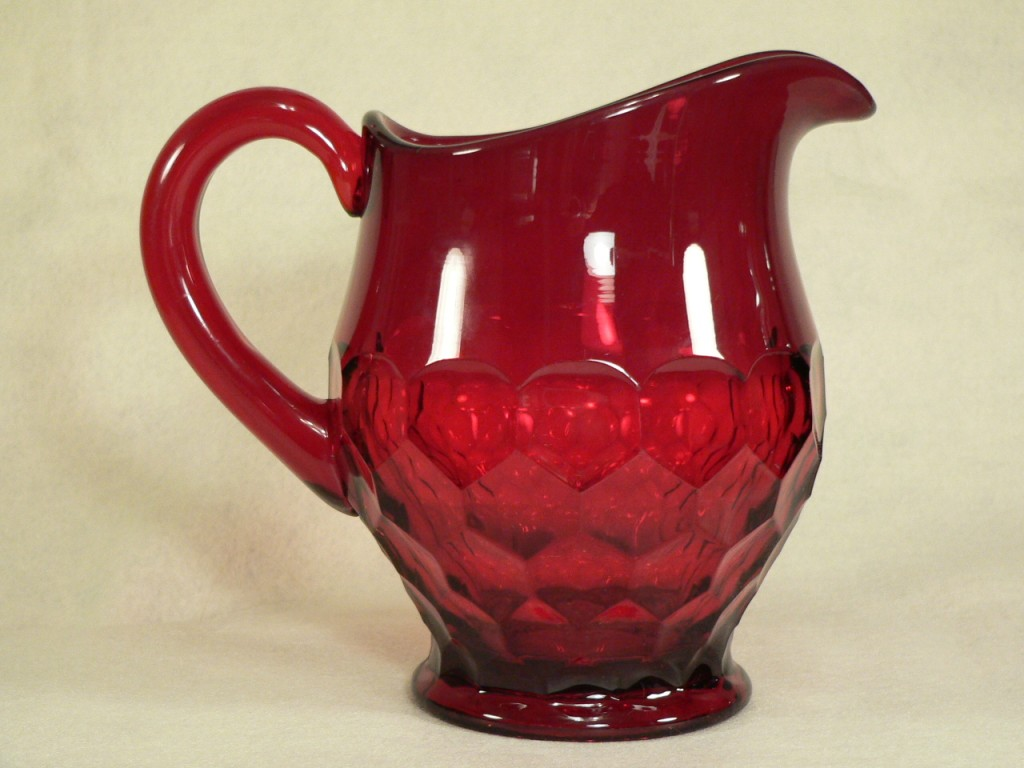
A ruby red pitcher in Duncan's Georgian pattern.

At its peak, Duncan & Miller's glass was one of Washington's most successful manufacturing concerns, and was more widely known throughout the county than any other line of goods made in Washington.

The glass making processes and technologies at Duncan & Miller did not significantly differ from contemporary glassmakers in Western Pennsylvania and neighboring Ohio and West Virginia. Duncan differentiated itself through exceptional artistry and design. This was accomplished by employing highly skilled workers, and using unique batch formulas to produce colorful glass. The production process for each piece usually required 10 craftsmen.

Some of the most popular styles were produced during the 1920s through the 1940s, including the Canterbury, Caribbean, Hobnail, Nautical, Sandwich, Spiral Flutes and Teardrop. The most famous design was a swan which required 14 craftsmen. The most popular etching designs were the First Love, Language of Flowers, and Passion Flower.

== Legacy and collections ==
The National Duncan Glass Society was founded in 1975 at a meeting of glass collectors at the Citizens Library in Washington, Pennsylvania. For the next 17 years, the society operated a Duncan Glass museum at the Washington County Historical Society office and the F. Julius LeMoyne House. On July 8, 1993, the society opened a stand-alone museum in an old building on Jefferson Avenue, near the original location of the Duncan glass plant.

One of the Duncan family residences was a 17-room Victorian mansion on Wheeling Street in Washington, Pennsylvania that was built in 1892. This mansion is now used as the Washington & Jefferson College President’s House. Its design is archetypical Queen Anne Victorian style, with ornate "gingerbread" details, stained and beveled glass, recessed doors and windows, and louvered wooden shutters. In 1944, Walter Hudson Baker, who was a graduate of Washington & Jefferson College, donated the house to the college in memory of his wife, Amy Duncan Baker; it has been used as the President's House since. It was profiled in a book of regional architecture by the Washington County History and Landmarks Foundation.
