= Novelty Glass Company =

Manufacturer in Ohio (1890–1893)

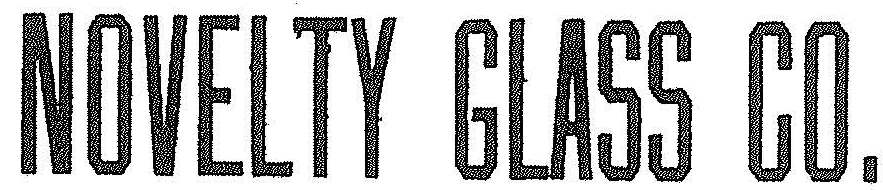
- Type: Corporation
- Industry: Glass manufacturing
- Predecessor: Buttler Art Glass Co.
- Founded: 1890
- Defunct: 1893
- Fate: Dissolved
- Successor: Factory T of United States Glass Company
- Headquarters: Fostoria, Ohio, US
- Key people: Rawson Crocker, Henry Crimmel
- Products: stemware, bar goods, novelties
- Number of employees: 100 (Factory T 1892)

Novelty Glass Company of Fostoria was one of over 70 glass manufacturing companies that operated in northwest Ohio during the region's brief Gas Boom in the late 19th century. The company made bar goods, stemware, and novelties. Organization began late in 1890, with banker Rawson Crocker as president and veteran glass man Henry Crimmel as plant manager. Production started in February 1891. The plant was built on the site of the former Buttler Art Glass Company (spelled with two "t"s), which had been destroyed by fire in 1889.

During the early 1890s, many manufacturers were producing novelties that honored the 400th anniversary of the voyages of Christopher Columbus. Novelty Glass Company's contribution included commemorative punch bowl sets and salt shakers. Some of this glassware was unusual because it displayed Columbus with a beard. This commemorative work has subsequently become valuable to collectors.

Like many companies during northwest Ohio’s brief Gas Boom, Novelty Glass Company was short-lived. The plant was shut down in January 1892, with a restart planned for April. This did not happen, and plant manager Henry Crimmel left the firm for the Sneath Glass Company in Tiffin, Ohio. In October, the Novelty plant was leased to the United States Glass Company, who also purchased the plant's inventory of molds and related equipment. Production began again, and the Novelty works became known as Factory T in the United States Glass Company conglomerate. Approximately 100 people were employed making drinking glasses and stemware. However, the restart did not last long, because the plant was destroyed by fire in April 1893.

== Background ==
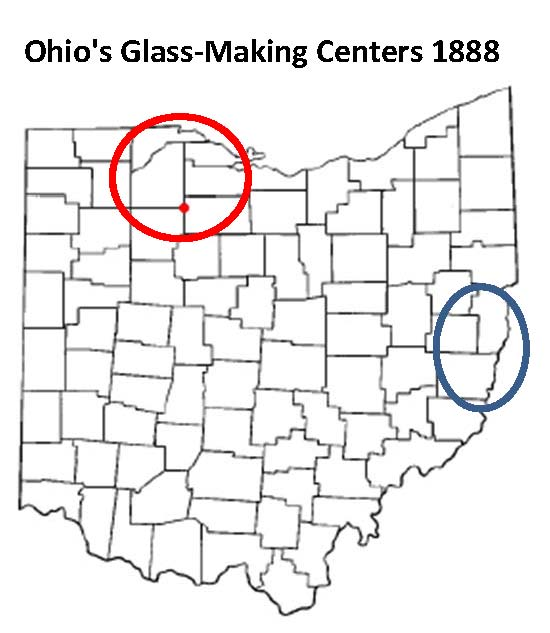
Old Ohio glass making center in east, and new in northwest (dot marks Fostoria)

In early 1886, a major discovery of natural gas occurred in northwest Ohio near the small village of Findlay. Soon, many more wells were drilled, and the area experienced an economic boom as gas workers, businesses, and factories were drawn to the area. Ohio already had a glass industry located principally in the eastern portion of the state, especially in Belmont County. The Belmont County community of Bellaire, located on the Ohio River near Wheeling, West Virginia, was known as "Glass City" from 1870 to 1885. The gas boom in northwestern Ohio enabled the state to improve its national ranking as a manufacturer of glass (based on value of product) from 4th in 1880 to 2nd in 1890. Over 70 glass companies operated in northwest Ohio between 1880 and the early 20th century. However, northwest Ohio’s gas boom lasted only five years. By 1890, the region was experiencing difficulty with its gas supply, and many manufacturers were already shutting down, using alternative fuels, or considering relocating.

Fostoria, Ohio, is located in northwestern Ohio, and government leaders constructed a pipeline from a nearby well that enabled Fostoria to participate in the rush to lure manufacturers to the area. Fostoria had a transportation advantage: numerous railroad lines ran through the city. (Note: The Fostoria Novelty Glass Co., in an 1891 advertisement, listed five railroads serving the town: the Baltimore and Ohio Railroad; the Toledo and Ohio Central Railway; New York, Chicago and St. Louis Railroad (a.k.a. the Nickel Plate Railroad); the Columbus, Hocking Valley and Toledo Railway; and the Lake Erie and Western Railroad.) Fostoria's first glass factory was the Mambourg Glass Company, which first produced window glass cylinders on October 26, 1887. The next glass works, and Fostoria's most famous, was the Fostoria Glass Company. The third glass factory was the Buttler Art Glass Company, which completed the construction of its glass works on February 22, 1888. Among early glass works investors in Fostoria were local banker Rawson Crocker and former Ohio governor Charles Foster. Eventually, Fostoria had 13 different glass companies at various times between 1887 and 1920. (Note: The count of Fostoria glass companies varies depending on how restarts and reorganizations are counted. The Fostoria Ohio Glass Association lists 13 companies for 1887-1920. Jack K. Paquette discusses 15 companies plus four post-boom companies in Chapter V of his Blowpipes book.)

== Organization ==
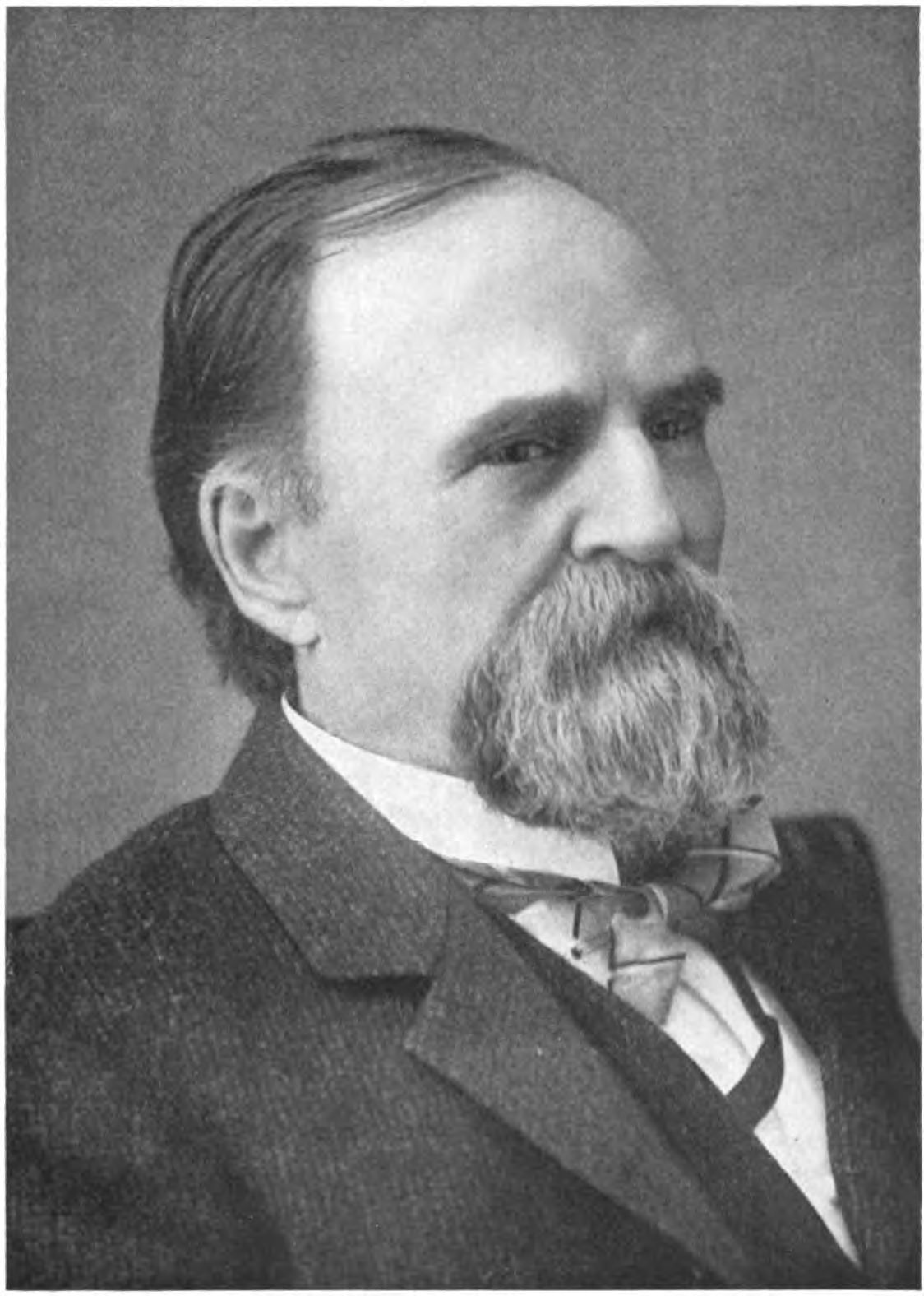
Charles Foster

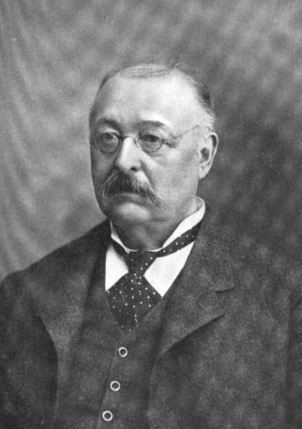
Rawson Crocker

Events at two other Fostoria glass factories led to the creation of Novelty Glass Company. First, the Buttler Art Glass plant burned to the ground in November 1889. Its owners decided to rebuild elsewhere, since the few fire hydrants nearby had low water pressure. (Note: Murray cites the November 28, 1889, edition of Crockery & Glass Journal for information on the fire at the Buttler Art Glass works. He cites the February 13, 1890, edition of Crockery & Glass Journal for information concerning the decision to not rebuild the factory.) The second event involved the Fostoria Glass Company. Owners of this company became concerned about natural gas shortages in 1890, and in April 1891 decided to move to Moundsville, West Virginia. Plant manager (and shareholder) Henry Crimmel sought to prevent the move, but was unsuccessful.

During late 1890, planning began to build a new glass works on the site of the former Buttler Art Glass Company. The new glass works was to be called Novelty Glass Company. The seven incorporators were Rawson Crocker, Andrew Emerine, Charles Olmsted, C. German, George Flechtner, A. C. Crimmel, and Henry Crimmel, and its directors were Crocker, Olmsted, Emerine, Henry Crimmel, and Charles Foster. The two Crimmels provided glass making expertise with their experience at the Fostoria Glass Company. Henry Crimmel had also previously worked at Belmont Glass Company in Bellaire, Ohio, and at J. H. Hobbs, Brockunier and Company in Wheeling, West Virginia. Crocker (Foster's cousin), Olmsted (Foster's brother-in-law), and Emerine were prominent Fostoria capitalists. Crocker was an officer of a local bank, and president of the Crocker Window Glass Company. Crocker was named president, and Emerine treasurer. A. C. Crimmel was company secretary, while Henry Crimmel was plant manager. (Note: At that time, Alva Clyde Crimmel was sometimes identified by the press as Henry Crimmel’s brother. However, he was identified as Henry Crimmel’s son in the elder Crimmel’s 1917 obituaries.)

The company was expected to employ about 150 people. Plans included a medium-sized 11-pot furnace and three lehrs for cooling the glass. (Note: Because most glass plants melted their ingredients in a pot, the plant's number of pots was often used to describe a plant's capacity. The ceramic pots were located inside the furnace. The pot contained molten glass created by melting a batch of ingredients that typically included sand, soda, lime, and other ingredients.) Production was expected to begin in early February 1891. Advertising called the company "The Fostoria Novelty Glass Company", and news articles called it both "Fostoria Novelty Glass Company" and "Novelty Glass Company". (An unrelated company called Fostoria Glass Novelty Company started about 25 years later.) The company’s products were described in advertisements as "fine lead blown tumblers, bar goods, stemware, and novelties". Pressed glassware was also part of the planning. In late 1890, Henry Crimmel had made a trip to Bellaire, Ohio, where he purchased some molds from the Belmont Glass Works. The Belmont works, where Crimmel had been plant manager before leaving for the Fostoria Glass Company, shut down earlier in the year.

== Production ==
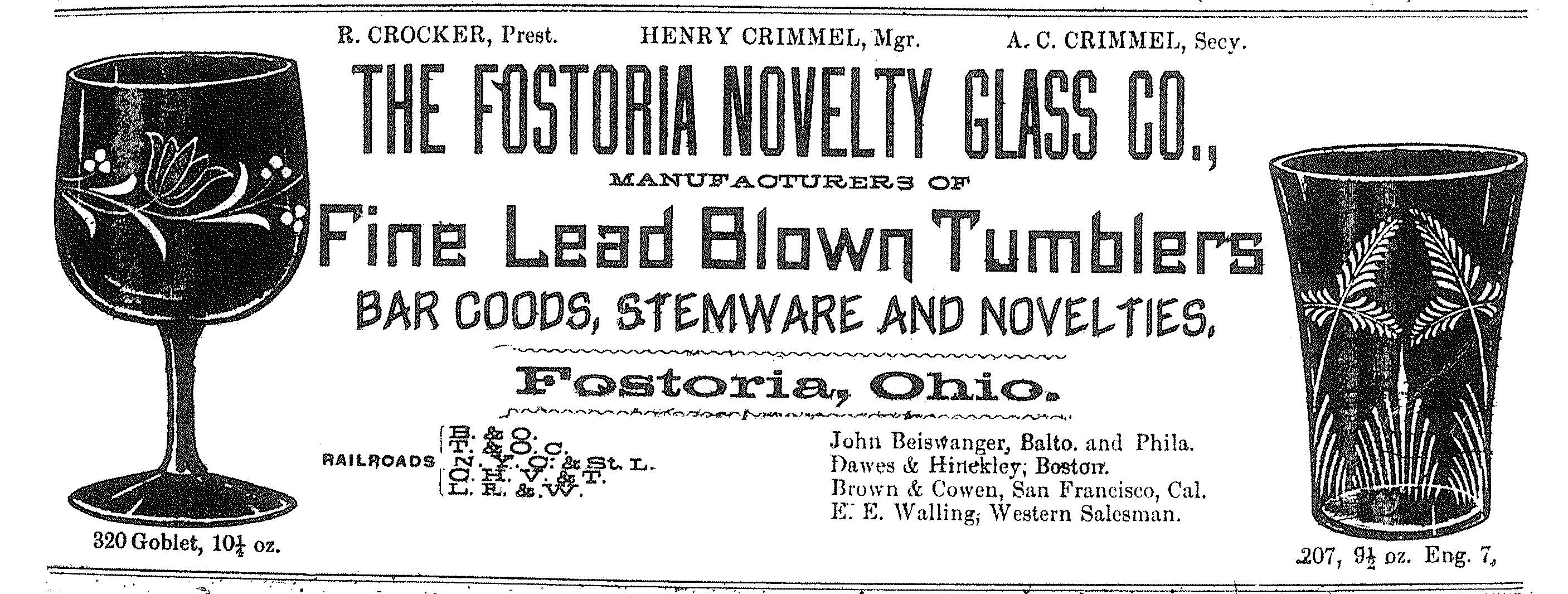
Novelty Glass Company advertisement in 1891

Production began on February 4, 1891 with blown glass tumblers. The factory began with a "light force of people", and it was not expected to operate at full capacity until close to the end of the month. Production went well, and continued until the two–month shutdown during the summer—a normal procedure for glass factories in that time period. (Note: Most glass factories during this period had a summer stop where the production was shut down for about six weeks. This was done because the summer heat, combined with the heat of the furnace, made the work environment almost unbearable for workers near molten glass. The summer stop also allowed time to perform maintenance on the facility without disrupting the production process.) After the end-of-summer restart, the factory produced through December.

At the time Novelty Glass Company began production, the 400th anniversary of Christopher Columbus’ discovery of America (in 1492) was only a year away. The World’s Fair, also called the Columbian Exposition, was being held in Chicago in 1893 to celebrate this occasion, and many manufacturers were producing items to commemorate both Columbus and the World’s Fair. Novelty Glass Company produced punch bowl sets and salt shakers honoring Columbus and Queen Isabella, who financed the expedition. Some of the punch bowl cups and salt shakers were atypical because they featured the explorer with a full beard. (Note: Compare the bearded Christopher Columbus with the United States commemorative coin featuring Columbus on the Columbian half dollar.) The cup has been described as "embossed clear pressed glass" with a "gilt painted bust of Columbus". The salt shaker was made of opalware (milk glass) and clear glass, and mold blown and pressed. Because of the short life of Novelty Glass Company, and the uniqueness of its Columbus glass novelties, those products are valuable to collectors. (Note: A 1998 book valued the Columbus and Isabella salt shakers as rare, $850 to $900 (equivalent to $1,728 in 2025) per pair.)

== Decline ==
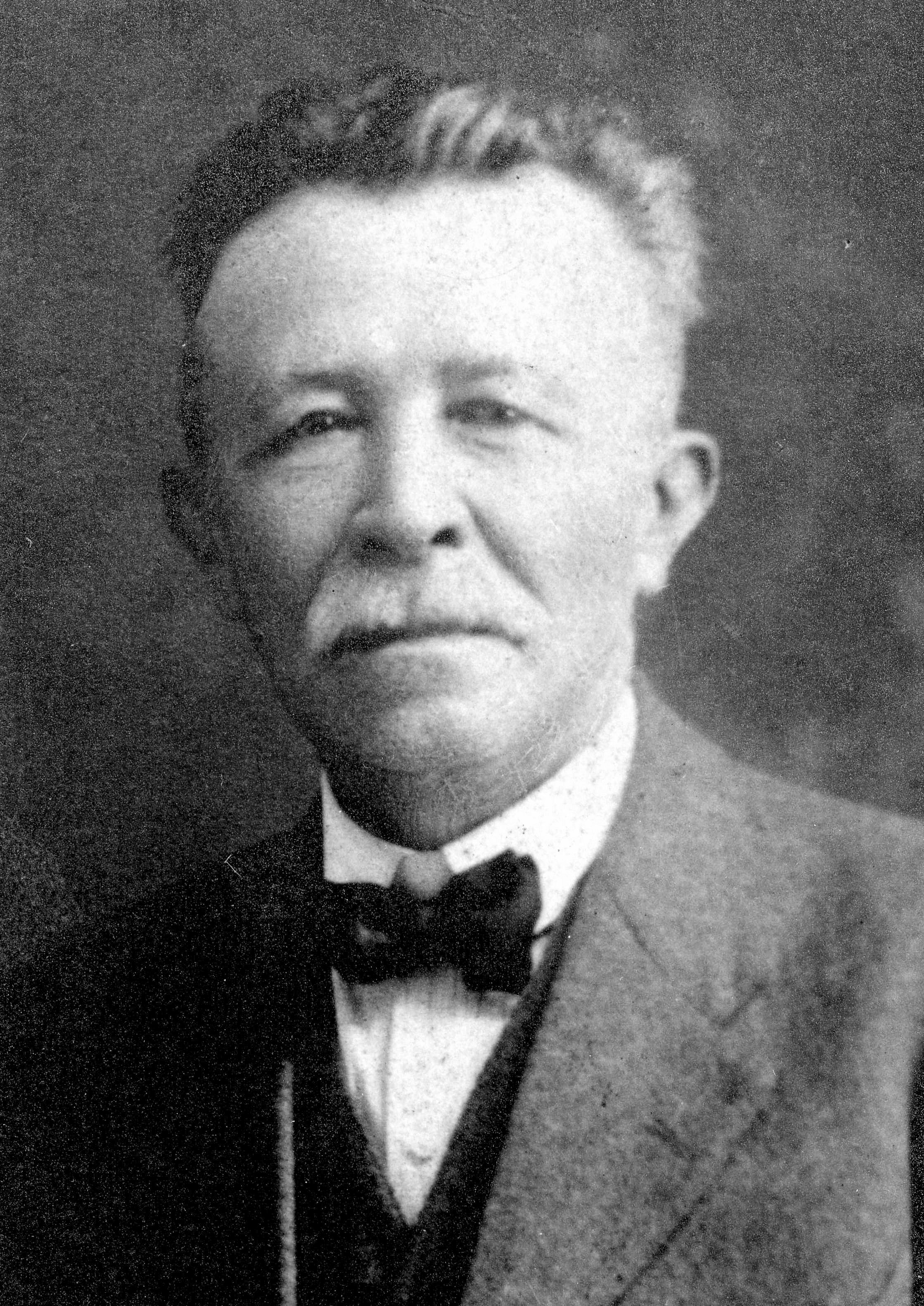
Henry Crimmel

The U.S. economy experienced multiple recessions during the 1880s and 1890s, making life difficult for manufacturing firms. The U.S. business cycle peaked during July 1890, and declined until May 1891. Although Novelty Glass restarted after the summer break in 1891, it shut down again in January 1892 because of a lack of orders. The original plan was to restart in April, but the shareholders decided during April that it was not worth reopening for the short period from April to the summer break. During May, plant manager Henry Crimmel left town to become the manager of Sneath Glass Company in Tiffin, Ohio.

After not reopening following the summer break, the shareholders sold Novelty’s equipment to the United States Glass Company in October. The conglomerate also leased Novelty’s glassmaking plant. The plant began operating as Factory T of the United States Glass Company, and had 100 employees. On April 1, 1893, like the Buttler Art Glass plant a few years earlier, the glass works was destroyed by fire. Management at the U.S. Glass Company decided not to continue operations at the Factory T location. Shareholders of Novelty Glass Company still owned the land and the ruins of the plant, and voted to liquidate the property in January 1896.

== Notes ==
=== References ===
- Geological Survey of Ohio (1890). Annual Report of the Geological Survey of Ohio. Columbus, Ohio: Westbote Co., State Printers. OCLC 13585464. Archived from the original on August 3, 2023.
- Lechner, Mildred; Lechner, Ralph (1998). The World of Salt Shakers: Antique & Art Glass Value Guide Volume III. Paducah, Kentucky: Collector Books. ISBN 9781574320657. OCLC 39502285.
- McKelvey, Alexander T. (1903). Centennial History of Belmont county, Ohio and Representative Citizens. Chicago: Biographical Publishing Company. OCLC 318390043. "Centennial history of belmont county."
- Murray, Melvin L. (1992). Fostoria, Ohio Glass II. Fostoria, OH: M. L. Murray. OCLC 27036061.
- National Glass Budget (1917). "Henry Crimmel Dead". Nation Glass Budget Weekly Review of the American Glass Industry. 33 (23). Pittsburgh: National Glass Budget. OCLC 473116336. Archived from the original on April 7, 2022.
- Paquette, Jack K. (2002). Blowpipes, Northwest Ohio Glassmaking in the Gas Boom of the 1880s. Xlibris Corp. ISBN 1-4010-4790-4. OCLC 50932436.
- Reed, Sarah M. (2005). "Novelty Glass Company (1890-1893) and Fostoria Glass Novelty Co. (c. 1915-1917)". Victoria Views. 12 (4 (December)). Fostoria, OH: The Fostoria, Ohio Glass Association.
- Shotwell, David J. (2002). Glass A to Z. Iola, Wisconsin: Krause Publications. pp. 638. ISBN 978-0-87349-385-7. OCLC 440702171.
- Skrabec, Quentin R. (2007). Glass in Northwest Ohio. Charleston, South Carolina: Arcadia. ISBN 978-0-73855-111-1. OCLC 124093123.
- Skrabec, Quentin R. (2007a). Michael Owens and the Glass Industry. Gretna, Louisiana: Pelican Publishing. OCLC 137341537.
- United States Census Office (1895). Report on manufacturing industries in the United States at the eleventh census: 1890. Washington: Government Printing Office. OCLC 10470409.
- Venable, Charles L.; Jenkins, Tom; Denker, Ellen P.; Grier, Katherine C. (2000). China and Glass in America, 1880-1980: from Tabletop to TV Tray. Dallas: Dallas Museum of Art. ISBN 978-0-81096-692-5. OCLC 905439701.
- Weeks, Joseph D.; United States Census Office (1884). Report on the Manufacture of Glass. Washington, District of Columbia: U.S. Government Printing Office. OCLC 2123984. Archived from the original on June 26, 2023.
