= Belmont Glass Works =

Glass manufacturer in 19th-century Ohio

- Company type: Corporation
- Industry: Glass manufacturing
- Predecessor: Barnes, Faupel & Co.
- Founded: 1865 (production began 1866)
- Defunct: 1890
- Fate: Dissolved
- Headquarters: Bellaire, Ohio
- Key people: Henry Faupel, John Robinson, Charles Henry Over, Henry Crimmel
- Products: lamps, bar goods
- Number of employees: 350 (1884)

Belmont Glass Works, also known as the Belmont Glass Company, was one of Ohio's early glassmaking companies. It was named after Belmont County, Ohio, where the plant was located. The firm began operations in 1866 in a riverfront village along the east side of the county, which is known as Bellaire. At that time, the community had resource advantages that made it an attractive site for glassmaking. Bellaire's location at the intersection of the Ohio River, the National Road, and two railroads meant it had an excellent transportation infrastructure. Fuel necessary for the glassmaking process was also readily available, since Belmont County was part of the Pittsburgh coal seam. Bellaire also had a workforce with glassmaking expertise located less than 10 miles (16 km) away, since glass had been produced in Wheeling, West Virginia, since the 1820s.

The men who organized the Belmont Glass Works included glassmakers with experience gained from the Hobbs, Brockunier and Company glassworks located in Wheeling. Their new company made glassware such as chimneys (the glass surrounding the wick in a lantern), lamps, and bar goods. Originally the products were blown glassware, but later pressed glassware was also produced. Products with intricate patterns such as Zipper were also made, and are valued today by collectors. Belmont Glass Works ceased operations in 1890. The economy at that time proved difficult for many manufacturers. In addition, many glass makers began moving to northwest Ohio in the late 1880s, lured by promises of free land, fuel, and cash.

Belmont Glass Works made a strong contribution to the American glass manufacturing industry, both during its period of operation and after the plant was closed. The company was Bellaire's first glassworks, and the second located in Belmont County. Bellaire soon attracted more glass manufacturers and became known as Glass City. Belmont County ranked sixth in the nation as a glass manufacturer by 1880. Men who gained or refined their glassmaking expertise working at Belmont Glass Works continued to grow the American glassmaking industry, even after Belmont Glass Works closed, as they helped start more glass factories in Ohio and Indiana.

== History ==
=== Wheeling and Bellaire ===
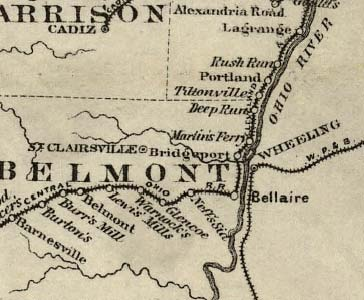
Wheeling and Bellaire in 1873, separated by the Ohio River

The history of Belmont Glass Company began in Wheeling, West Virginia, as much of the company's original glassmaking talent worked in that town. Wheeling was an early glass producing center in the region west of the Appalachian Mountains, where glass was first made in the 1820s. This success, supported by low cost fuel and the Ohio River as a transportation resource, encouraged other firms to make glass in Wheeling. One of the larger glassworks on the south side of town was purchased by the Hobbs family in 1845. This firm operated under various names, and was still in operation in the 1880s under the name of J. H. Hobbs, Brockunier and Company. (Note: The Hobbs works changed names multiple times over a 45-year period. One of the early names was Barnes, Hobbs and Company. It was also known as J. H. Hobbs, Brockunier and Company, and later Hobbs Glass Company.)

The Ohio community of Bellaire had fuel and transportation resources, and laborers with glassmaking expertise lived nearby in Wheeling. Bellaire is located in Belmont County, Ohio, along the Ohio River and well under 10 miles (16 km) from Wheeling. Belmont County is located in the Pittsburgh coal seam. At one time, steamships traveling down the Ohio River knew Bellaire as the last stop for coal until they arrived at Cincinnati. During the 1850s, the town had railroad service to Columbus via the Central Ohio Railroad (acquired by the Baltimore and Ohio Railroad in 1866), and service to Cleveland and Pittsburgh via the Cleveland and Pittsburgh Railroad. The National Road also ran through Bellaire.

=== Beginning ===
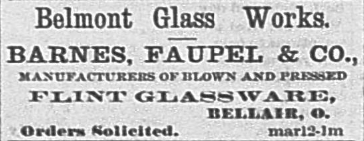
Advertisement in Wheeling newspaper dated March 12, 1866

In August 1865, a new glass manufacturer called Barnes, Faupel and Company was organized in Bellaire, Ohio, as a cooperative. The association was started by 18 men from Wheeling and Pittsburg who had glassmaking experience. Directors were W.G. Barnard, Henry Faupel, Charles Henry Over, John Robinson, and David Carr. (Note: Faupel's name is sometimes misspelled. Two examples in books are "Fnapel" or "Fauple". His name is spelled as "Faupel" in another book, a company advertisement, and his patent.) Others involved in the early years were George B. Barnes as business manager and financier, Henry J. Leasure as factory superintendent, C.T. Cowan as superintendent of packing and shipping, James W. Gill, H. Robinson, B. Robinson, John Crimmel, and Henry Crimmel. At least three of these men were American Civil War veterans: Henry Crimmel, Charles Henry Over, and John Robinson. The same three men had worked previously at J. H. Hobbs, Brockunier and Company in Wheeling, and all three eventually became plant managers.

The Belmont Glass Works was the first of Bellaire's many glass plants, and the second in Belmont County. (Note: A different "Belmont Glass Works" was established in 1805 in Birmingham, England.) The company helped the community become a major glassmaking center. In 1880, the state of Ohio ranked fourth in the country in glass production, and Belmont County ranked sixth among the nation's counties. During the early 1880s, the town had about 15 glass factories operating at full capacity, and was known as "Glass City". At the beginning of the next decade, the state of Ohio was ranked second in the nation in glass production based on the value of the product, and also ranked second in average number of glass employees.

=== Operations and incorporation ===
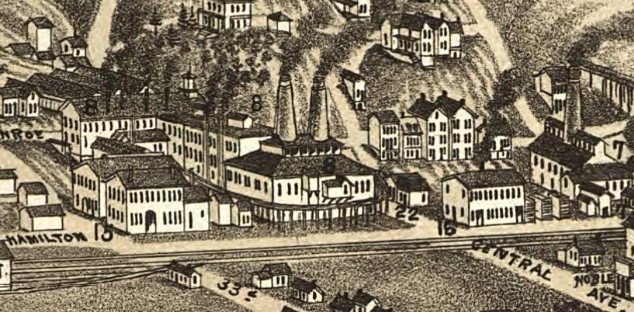
1882 drawing of the Belmont Glass Works (center with smokestacks) and surroundings

The new glassworks began manufacturing in January 1866, and products were sold in Wheeling, Philadelphia, Pittsburgh, and Cincinnati. (Note: Several sources cite 1866, the year production began, as the company's start year. Two sources incorrectly use 1861 as the start.) Although the company name was Barnes, Faupel and Company, the glassmaking plant was called Belmont Glass Works. Products were blown and pressed glassware, including wares blown into molds. One category of products was lamps, which were used for home lighting. (Note: Kerosine lamps were used in the home for lighting during the 1860s, since electric lighting did not begin until the late 1800s. Lamps consisted of a stand, font, chimney, and often a shade. The font (also spelled "fount") held the kerosine for the lamp. The chimney was a glass tube placed around the lamp's flame that had a bulge at the base that kept drafts away from the flame and added extra illumination. A lamp's shade was a glass object that surrounded the light source and diffused it.) Other types of products were goblets, bar goods, and tablewares including salt shakers. By the end of 1867, the glassworks had more orders for glassware than it could produce. The products were considered superior, and a major reason for the high quality was that the main workers were the owners of the business.

In December 1868, the cooperative was incorporated under the name Belmont Glass Works. (Note: Sources conflict about the company name. The state of Ohio, listing new incorporations, calls the company "Belmont Glass Works", as does a newspaper article discussing the incorporation. Other sources that use "Works" in the name include: McKelvey, Crammer et al., the Ohio Department of Inspection, and the Wiggins and Weaver directory (see Faupel, Henry). Lechner and Lechner list the company name as "Belmont Glass Company" from 1866 to 1888, and "Belmont Glass Works" from 1888 to 1890. Paquette, Revi, and Shotwell call the firm "Belmont Glass Company".) The incorporators were Henry Faupel, Levi Cassell, James S. Gill, Charles Henry Over, John Robinson, John Crimmel, and Thomas J. Fleming. An 1871 directory provides a glimpse of some of the skills of the early work force and company founders. Henry Faupel is listed as president of Belmont Glass Works, and William Gorby as treasurer. Levi Cassell is listed as the Belmont Glass Works manager. Charles Henry Over, John Robinson, and John Crimmel are listed as glass-blowers.

=== 1870s ===
Directors elected for 1870 were Henry Faupel, Levi Cassell, Charles H. Over, General George Washington Hoge, C. Hess, John Robinson, and Henry Carr. Faupel was company president. By February 1870, the company was producing about $200,000 (equivalent to $5,092,105 in 2025) worth of glass per year, and was considering adding to its capacity. A new furnace was in operation by November 1870, giving the factory two furnaces and more than double the original capacity.

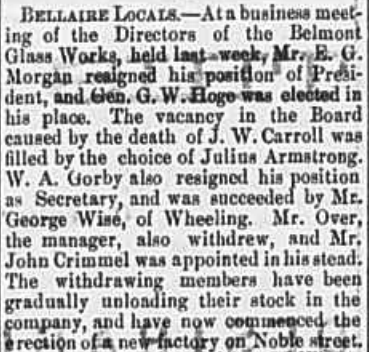
Portions of the company's management left in 1876 to form a new company.

In 1872, with the plant's capacity expanded, its employee count exceeded 150. That same year, Charles Henry Over, John Robinson, and Henry Faupel patented a seamless chimney mold for lamps—an improvement to the current version that left seams on the glass. James Hobbs, of Wheeling, was elected president in 1873. William A. Gorby was secretary.

At the beginning of 1875 General George Washington Hoge was elected president of the company, and William A. Gorby secretary. A newspaper noted that $500 (equivalent to $12,094 in 2025) of the company's original stock was worth $3,125 (equivalent to $88,925 in 2025), and called the company "one of the most reliable and flourishing establishments in the country".

E.G. Morgan became president in 1876. During the year, many of the company's directors began selling their company stock. This portion of management submitted resignations in August. E.G. Morgan (president), William A. Gorby (secretary), Charles Henry Over (manager), John Robinson, and others formed a new (and separate) glassmaking venture called Bellaire Goblet Company.

=== 1880s ===
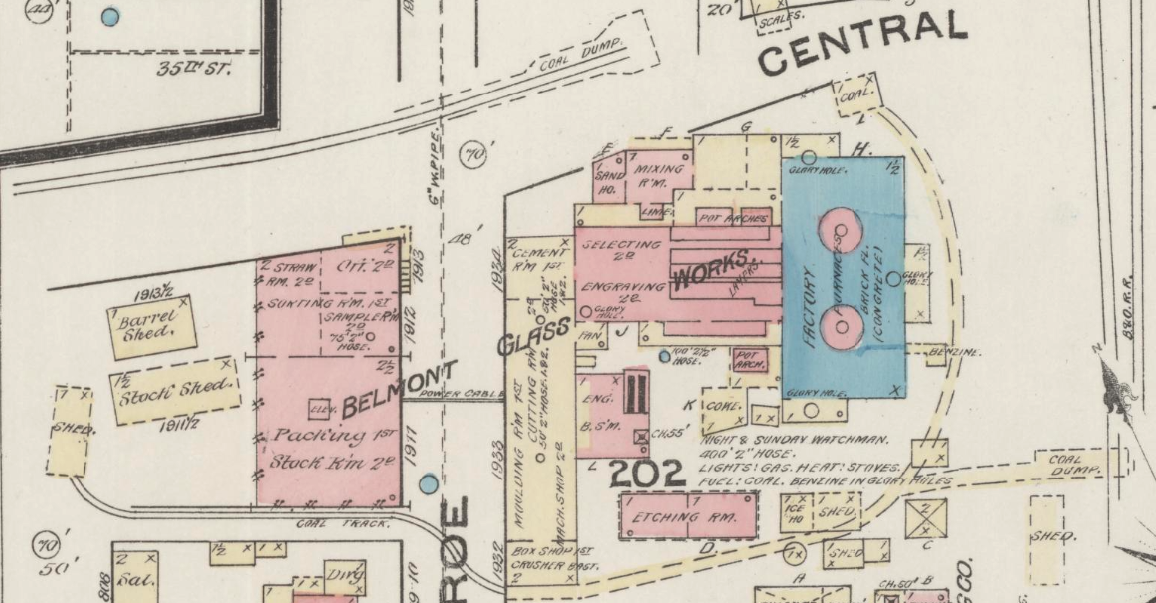
Insurance map for Belmont Glass Works, September 1884

During the 1880s, the company was producing sophisticated novelty items such as salt shakers with zipper patterns and translucent striped opalescent glass. The board of directors elected for 1880 were Julius Armstrong, John Crimmel, L.C. Stifel, Jacob Wise, S.O. Cummins, James S. Gill, and George Wise. Armstrong was president, and Matthias Sheets was secretary.

By 1884, Belmont Glass Works employed 225 men, 25 women, and 100 minors. Charles H. Tallman became company president during the year. Tallman died in 1888, and was succeeded as president by Matthias Sheets. Original incorporators John Crimmel and Henry Faupel died in 1888, and 1889, respectively.

=== Decline ===
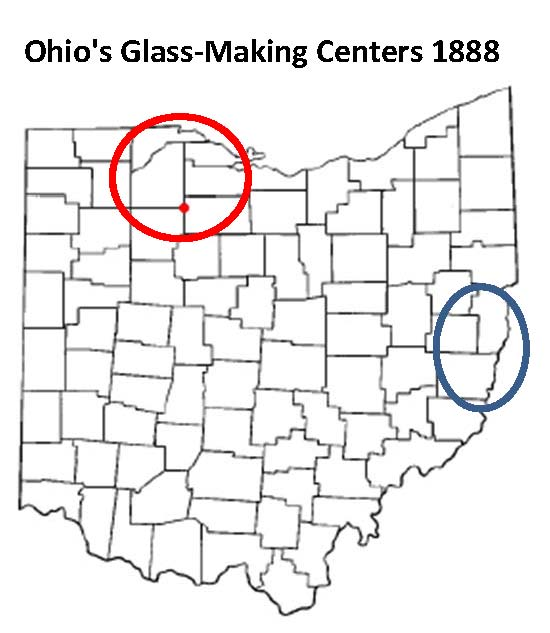
Old Ohio glassmaking center in east, and new in northwest; the dot marks Fostoria).

Several issues contributed to the eventual closing of the Belmont Glass Works. The company lost some talent as early as 1876, when John Robinson, C. H. Over, and William Gorby began focusing on their new glassworks. It also lost some leaders with the deaths of Tallman and Faupel in the late 1880s. Faupel's death was unexpected.

A bigger problem was the discovery of natural gas in northwest Ohio, and later the Indiana gas boom in East Central Indiana. In early 1886, a major discovery of natural gas occurred near the small village of Findlay. Soon, communities in the area were enticing glass companies to relocate with promises of free fuel, free land, and cash. The new glass businesses needed experienced glass workers to run the factories, and were willing to entice them. Henry Crimmel, who had been plant manager of Belmont Glass Works in 1883, left the company in 1887 to manage Fostoria's new glass factory in northwest Ohio. Later in the year, 20 skilled glass workers from Bellaire left to join him in Fostoria. A final blow to the Belmont Glass Works was the U.S. economy, which experienced three recessions between 1882 and 1891.

By 1888, the Belmont Glass Works was down to 185 male employees, plus 20 women and 30 minors. In January 1890 it was noted that the Belmont Glass Works and the Union Window Glass Works did not pay dividends for 1889's business. Belmont Glass was said to have "one of the finest lines of tableware in the country", but had to sell its products at low prices to meet competition—resulting in no profits. The city of Bellaire, which had 17 glass factories in 1884, had only three remaining by 1891. Shareholders of the Belmont Glass Works decided to cease operations during June 1890. In 1893, the Novelty Stamping Company began operating in a new building constructed on the site of the former glassworks.

== Products ==
Blown tumblers were a specialty of Belmont Glass, but they also made lamps, tableware, and bar goods. Listed below is a brief (not all–inclusive) list of some of the Belmont Glass Works products. (Note: The products discussed herein are mentioned in Revi's pressed glass book, the Lechner & Lechner salt shakers book, the U.S. Patent Office, or a newspaper.)

- Aida - The Aida pattern was used with crystal glass in the 1880s.
- Dewberry - This design was patented by Stephen Hipkins Jr. on April 12, 1870. The ornamentation was designed to look like a dewberry vine, including the fruit and leaves. It is similar to a Blackberry pattern belonging to J. H. Hobbs, Brockunier and Company.
- Emperor William Beer Mug - A few months after King William I of Prussia was declared emperor of the newly united German Empire, Belmont Glass began producing an Emperor William beer mug that featured the emperor on the glass along with Prussian colors. (Note: In 1860, Germans were the largest ethnic group in Wheeling, and accounted for about one third of the city's voting-age males. Wheeling, West Virginia (Virginia in 1860) is located about six miles (9.7 km) upriver from Bellaire, Ohio, which was the home of Belmont Glass Works. In Europe at the beginning of 1871, King William I of Prussia was declared emperor of the newly united German Empire.)
- Giant Bull's Eye - This pattern, produced in crystal glass, was also known as Excelsior, and it was pattern number 151.
- No. 100 - A Daisy & Button pattern produced in crystal and colored glass.
- Royal - Tableware using this pattern typically had ball–feet, and a portrait of a princess-like young woman with ornate head-dress. Wares included a bread plate, celery vase, goblet, pitcher, and tumbler. A version with the same appearance, but using a collar base instead of ball–feet, is called Venus.
- Stripe - Design for salt shakers or small containers using translucent opalescent glass with a vertical stripe. Products were mold blown.
- Swan Covered Dish - This design was patented in 1884, and featured a swan on top of a covered dish. The neck of the swan served as the handle for the lid.
- Zipper - This pattern, number 104, looks like a series of vertical zippers typically found on the corners of glassware such as salt shakers.
Belmont Glass Works
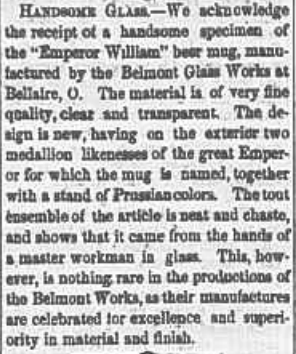
1871 company's new beer mug

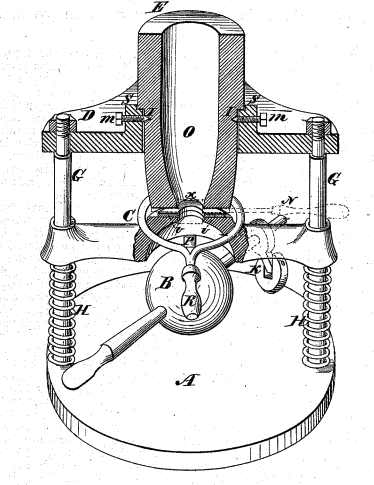
1872 patent illustration of mold for a drinking glass

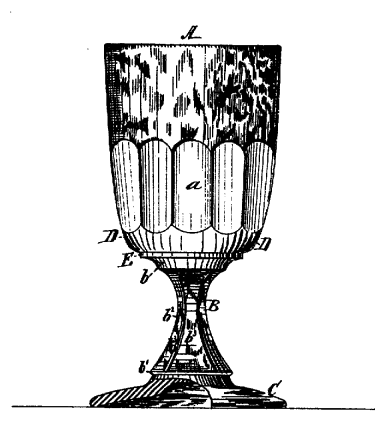
1873 patent illustration of a goblet, by James Hobbs

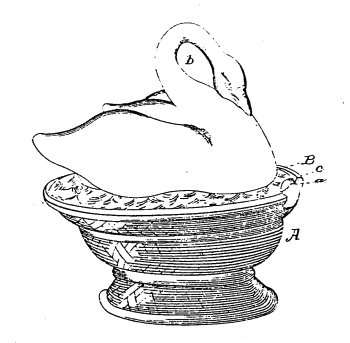
1884 patent illustration of a swan serving dish

== Legacy ==
=== Bellaire Goblet Company ===
Former directors and employees of Belmont Glass Works contributed to the growth of the American glass industry while the company operated and after its closing in 1890. Charles Henry Over left Belmont Glass in 1876 to form the Bellaire Goblet Company, which became nationally known for its tableware products. Joining him were Judge E. G. Morgan, William Gorby, John Robinson, Melvin Blackburn, and Henry Carr. Morgan was the new company's president, Gorby the secretary, C. H. Over the manager, and Robinson the plant superintendent. (Note: Morgan had been on the board of directors of Belmont Glass Works in 1875 and 1876, and was elected president of Belmont Glass Works in 1876.) By 1888, their plant employed about 300 people.

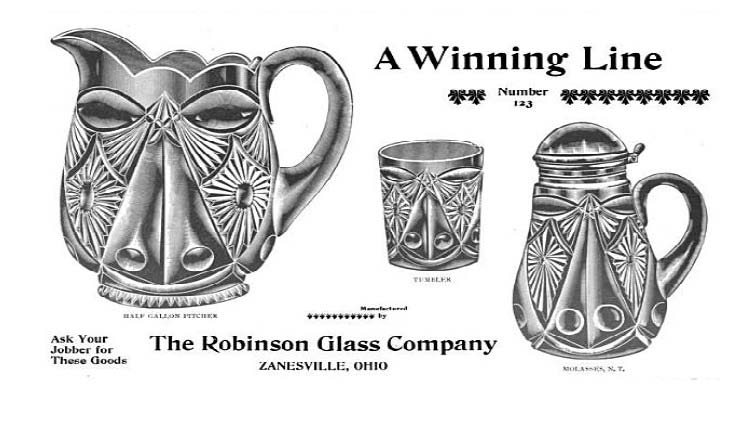
Robinson Glass Company advertisement

In 1888, the Bellaire Goblet Company moved to Findlay, Ohio, to take advantage of the low-cost natural gas. Henry Over decided not to move to Findlay, and instead founded a new window glassworks in Muncie, Indiana: C. H. Over and Company Glass Works. This glass factory employed about 175 people. John Robinson, who had been plant superintendent when working at Belmont Glass, replaced Henry Over as factory manager at Bellaire Goblet.

In 1891, Bellaire Goblet became part of the U.S. Glass Company conglomerate. While William Gorby remained with the parent firm for many years, Robinson eventually resigned. In 1893, Robinson started the Robinson Glass Company in Zanesville, Ohio. Financial assistance was provided by additional investors, including Melvin Blackburn—a partner from the Bellaire Goblet Company. The company produced tableware such as jelly glasses, bar goods, and novelties.

=== Fostoria Glass Company ===
John and Henry Crimmel were involved with Belmont Glass Works from the start, and their brother Jacob worked there for several periods. (Note: John, Henry, and Jacob Crimmel were brothers.) Henry and Jacob Crimmel moved to Fostoria, Ohio, in 1887 to help with the startup of the Fostoria Glass Company. They both were considered "key craftsmen in the early period" of Fostoria Glass Company, and both had also worked at the Hobbs plant in Wheeling. Their “recipes” for various types of glass were used in the early days of the Fostoria Glass Company. (Note: Recipes for different types and colors of glass were rarely written, but the Crimmels had a written recipe book that still exists today. Some pages from the recipe book are shown in the book Fostoria, Ohio Glass II.) Henry Crimmel was also involved with the startups of the Novelty Glass Company of Fostoria and the Sneath Glass Company when it relocated to East Central Indiana. Jacob Crimmel was one of the founders of the American Flint Glass Workers' Union, and wrote articles published in the union's journal, American Flint.

== Notes ==
=== References ===
- Bolger, Doreen; Metropolitan Museum of Art (1986). In Pursuit of Beauty: Americans and the Aesthetic Movement. Rizzoli, New York: The Metropolitan Museum of Art. ISBN 978-0-87099-467-8. OCLC 13820767.
- Bruno, Holly; Ehritz, Andrew (2009). Bellaire. Charleston, SC: Arcadia Publishing. ISBN 978-0-7385-6006-9. OCLC 320804618.
- Cook, Harry H. (March 1928). "A Sturdy Old Oak". American Flint. XIX (5). Toledo, Ohio: American Flint Glass Workers' Union: 12–14. OCLC 3956009.
- Crammer, Gibson L.; Jepson, Samuel L.; Trainer, John H.S. and William Morrison; Taneyhill, R. H. (1890). History of the Upper Ohio Valley: with family history and biographical sketches. A statement of its resources, industrial growth and commercial advantages… Vol. I & II. Madison, WI: Brant & Fuller. p. 820. OCLC 49762897.
- Edwards, Bill; Carwile, Mike (1999). Standard Encyclopedia of Pressed Glass, 1860-1930: Identification and Values. Paducah, Kentucky: Collector Books. p. 270. OCLC 81023964.
- Glass, James A.; Kohrman, David (2005). The Gas Boom of East Central Indiana. Image of America. Charleston, SC: Arcadia. ISBN 978-0-7385-3963-8. OCLC 61885891.
- Kamm, Minnie Watson (1950). A Fourth Two Hundred Pattern Glass Book. Grosse Pointe, Michigan: Kamm Publication. OCLC 1346863189.
- Lechner, Mildred; Lechner, Ralph (1998). The World of Salt Shakers: Antique & Art Glass Value Guide Volume III. Paducah, Kentucky: Collector Books. p. 312. ISBN 978-1-57432-065-7. OCLC 39502285.
- McKelvey, Alexander T. (1903). Centennial History of Belmont County, Ohio and Representative Citizens. Chicago: Biographical Publishing Company. OCLC 318390043.
- Murray, Melvin L. (1992). Fostoria, Ohio Glass II. Fostoria, OH: M. L. Murray. p. 184. OCLC 27036061.
- Ohio Department of Inspection of Workshops and Factories (1885). "Annual report of the State Inspector of Shops and Factories". Annual report of the State Inspector of Shops and Factories. 1 (1884). Columbus, OH: Ohio Department of Inspection of Workshops and Factories. OCLC 13049618.
- Ohio (1870). "Incorporated Companies (from Nov. 15th, 1868, to Nov. 15th 1869.)". Annual report of the Secretary of State, to the Governor of the State of Ohio for the Year 1869. Columbus, Ohio: Columbus Printing Company, State Printers. OCLC 11522890.
- Ohio Department of Inspection of Workshops and Factories (1889). "Annual report of the State Inspector of Shops and Factories". Annual report of the State Inspector of Shops and Factories. 5 (1888). Columbus, Ohio: Ohio Department of Inspection of Workshops and Factories. OCLC 243888847.
- Paquette, Jack K. (2002). Blowpipes, Northwest Ohio Glassmaking in the Gas Boom of the 1880s. Xlibris Corp. p. 559. ISBN 1-4010-4790-4. OCLC 50932436.
- Revi, Albert Christian (1964). American Pressed Glass and Figure Bottles. New York: Nelson. OCLC 965803.
- Shotwell, David J. (2002). Glass A to Z. Iola, Wisconsin: Krause Publications. ISBN 978-0-87349-385-7. OCLC 440702171.
- United States Census Office (1895). Report on manufacturing industries in the United States at the eleventh census: 1890. Washington: Government Printing Office. OCLC 273634.
- Unnamed (December 1879). "W. Gammon & Co". The Pottery Gazette. 1 (2). London: J. Everett: 499. OCLC 81248997.
- Unnamed (June 1896). "Zanesville". The Glass and Pottery World. IV (6). Chicago, Illinois: Glass and Pottery World Co.: 38.
- Unnamed (December 1903). "Glass Manufacturing in the Ohio Valley, A 1903 Review". Crockery and Glass Journal. 58 (25). New York City: G. Whittemore & Co.: 123–125. OCLC 4561501.
- Unnamed (October 1902). "(Untitled at bottom of page, beginning with Bellaire, formerly the "Glass City")". Glass and Pottery World. X (10). Chicago: Porter, Taylor, and Co. OCLC 1390202.
- Unnamed (March 1939). "Jacob Crimmel, Dean of Glass Workers, Called". American Flint. XXVIII (1). Toledo, OH: American Flint Glass Workers' Union: 26.
- Venable, Charles L.; Jenkins, Tom; Denker, Ellen P.; Grier, Katherine C. (2000). China and Glass in America, 1880-1980: from Tabletop to TV Tray. Dallas: Dallas Museum of Art. ISBN 978-0-81096-692-5. OCLC 905439701.
- Weeks, Joseph Dame; United States Census Office (1884). Report on the manufacture of glass. Washington: Government Printing Office. OCLC 2123984.
- Wiggins; Weaver (1871). Wiggins and Weaver's Ohio River directory for 1871–72 ... a full alphabetical record of ... the inhabitants and business directories of Wheeling, Parkersburgh, Marietta, Pomeroy, Gallipolis, Ironton, Portsmouth, Ripley, Bellair, Bridgeport, Harmar, Middleport, Martins Ferry, Maysville, Owensboro, Paducah, Lawrenceburg, Aurora, Madison, Cairo, Chester, Cape Girardeau. Cleveland, OH: Fairbanks, Benedict & Co. p. 419. OCLC 13806479.
