= Milk glass =

Opaque or translucent, milk white or colored glass

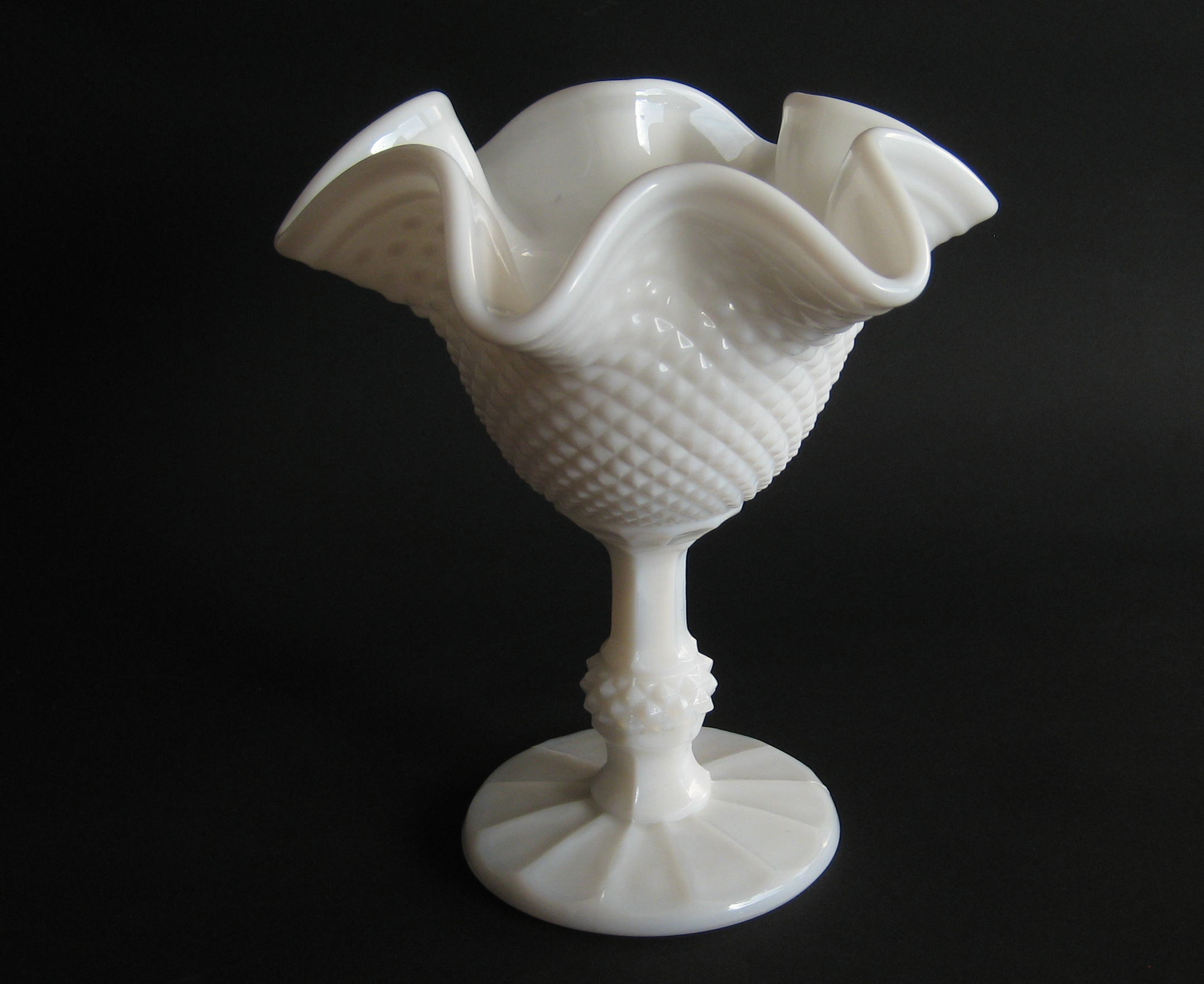
Decorative pedestal milk glass bowl

Milk glass is an opaque or translucent, milk white or colored glass that can be blown or pressed into a wide variety of shapes. First made in Venice in the 16th century, colors include blue, pink, yellow, brown, black, and white.

== Principle ==
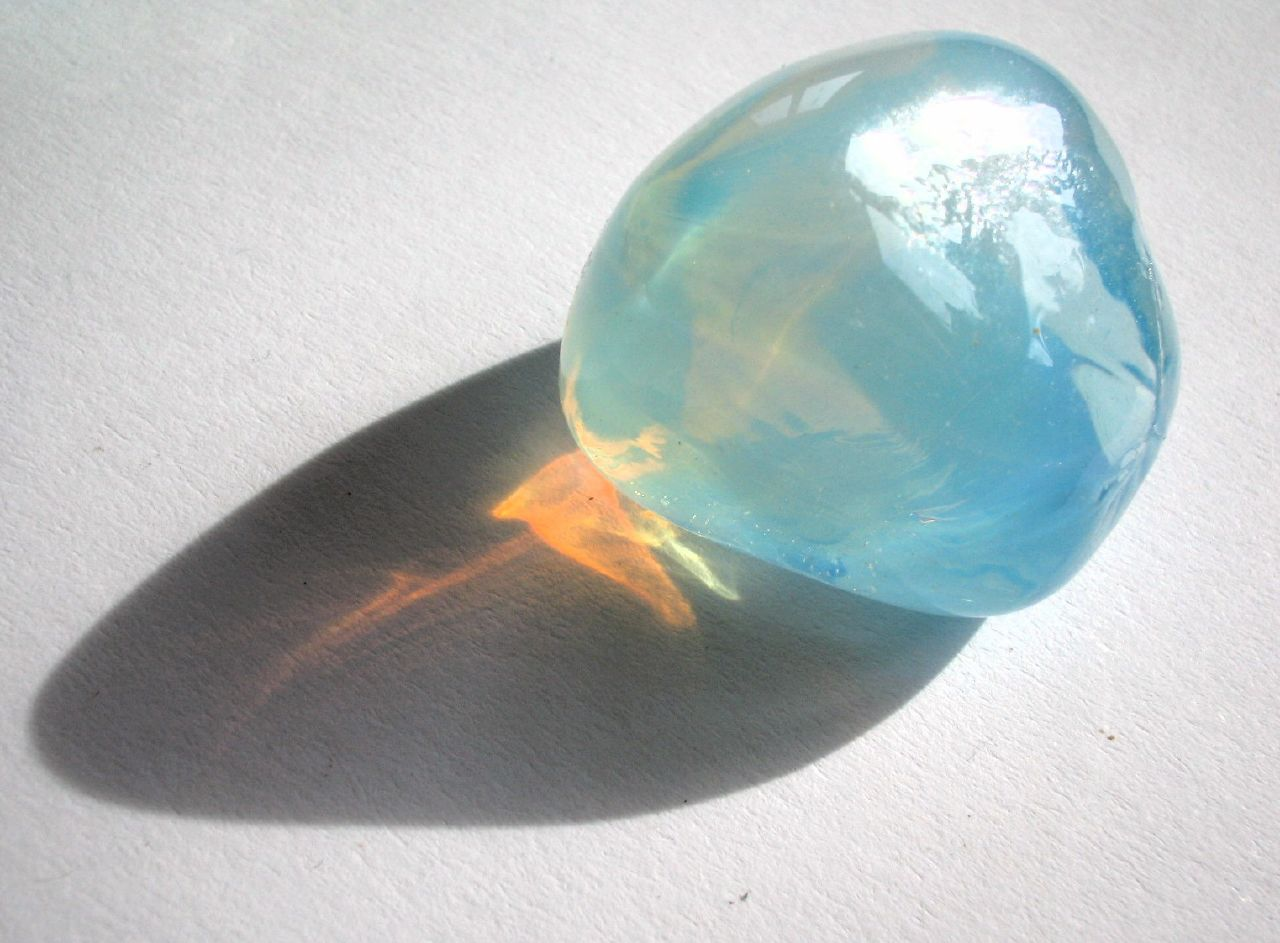
The Tyndall effect in opalescent glass: It appears blue from the side, but orange light shines through.

Milk glass contains dispersion particles with a refractive index significantly different from the glass matrix which scatters light by the Tyndall scattering effect. The size, distribution, and density of the particles controls the overall effect; which may range from mild opalization to opaque white. Some glasses are somewhat more blue from the side and somewhat red-orange in pass-through light.

The particles are produced by the addition of opacifiers to the molten glass. Some opacifiers can be insoluble and are only dispersed in the melt. Others are added as precursors and react in the melt or dissolve in the molten glass and then precipitate as crystals upon cooling. This is similar to color production in striking glasses though the particles are much bigger.

A variety of opacifiers can be used: bone ash, tin dioxide, arsenic, and antimony compounds. These are also added to ceramic glazes which, chemically, can be considered a specific kind of milk glass.

== History ==
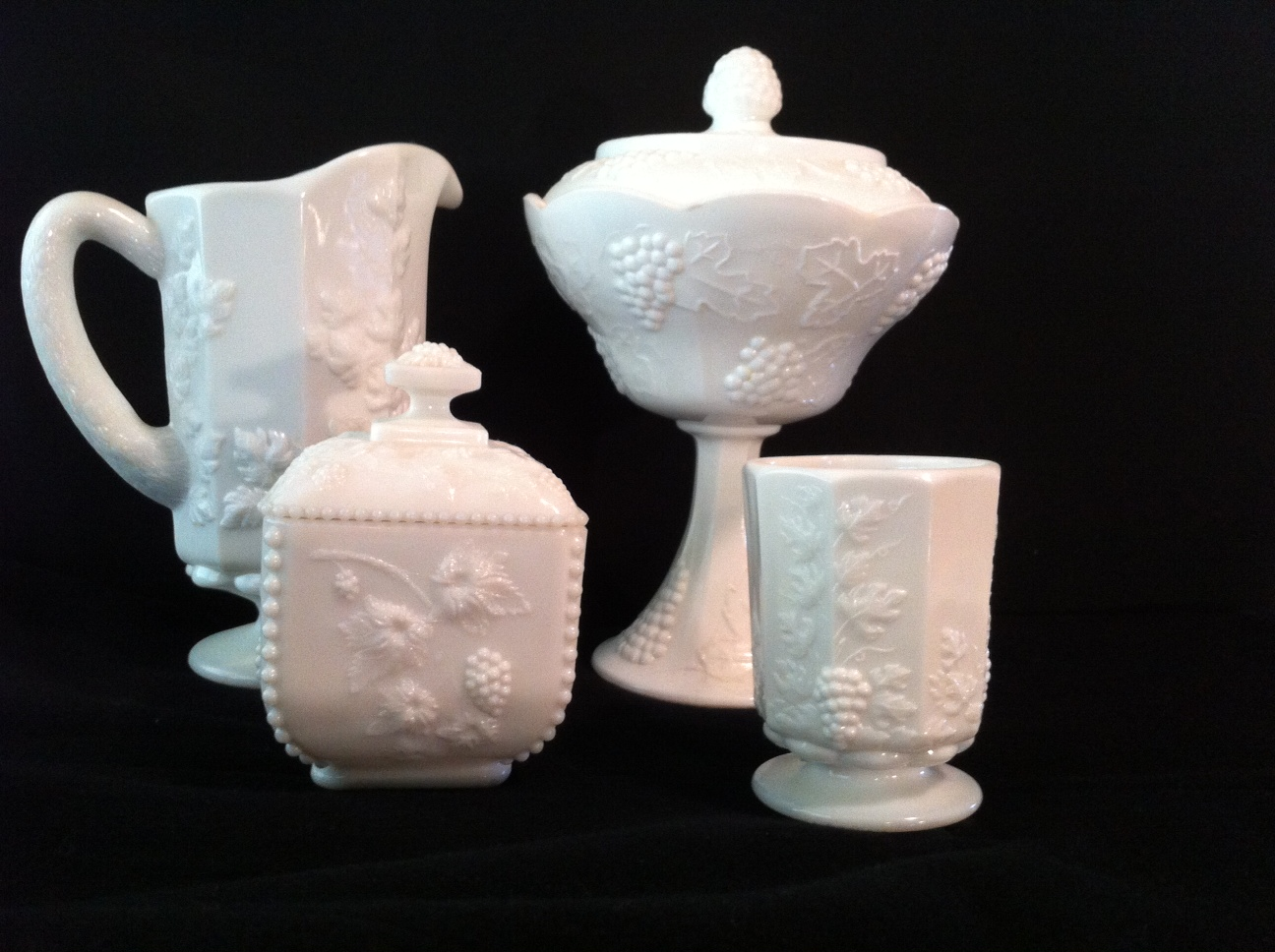
Milk glass – four pieces

Milk glass was first made in Venice in the 16th century (lattimo) as a translucent competitor for porcelain. Colors include blue, pink, yellow, brown, black, and white. Some 19th-century glass makers called milky white opaque glass "opal glass". The name milk glass is relatively recent.

Made into decorative dinnerware, lamps, vases, and costume jewellery, milk glass was highly popular during the fin de siècle. Pieces made for the wealthy of the Gilded Age are known for their strikingly delicate beauty in both color and design while Depression glass pieces of the 1930s and 1940s are less so.

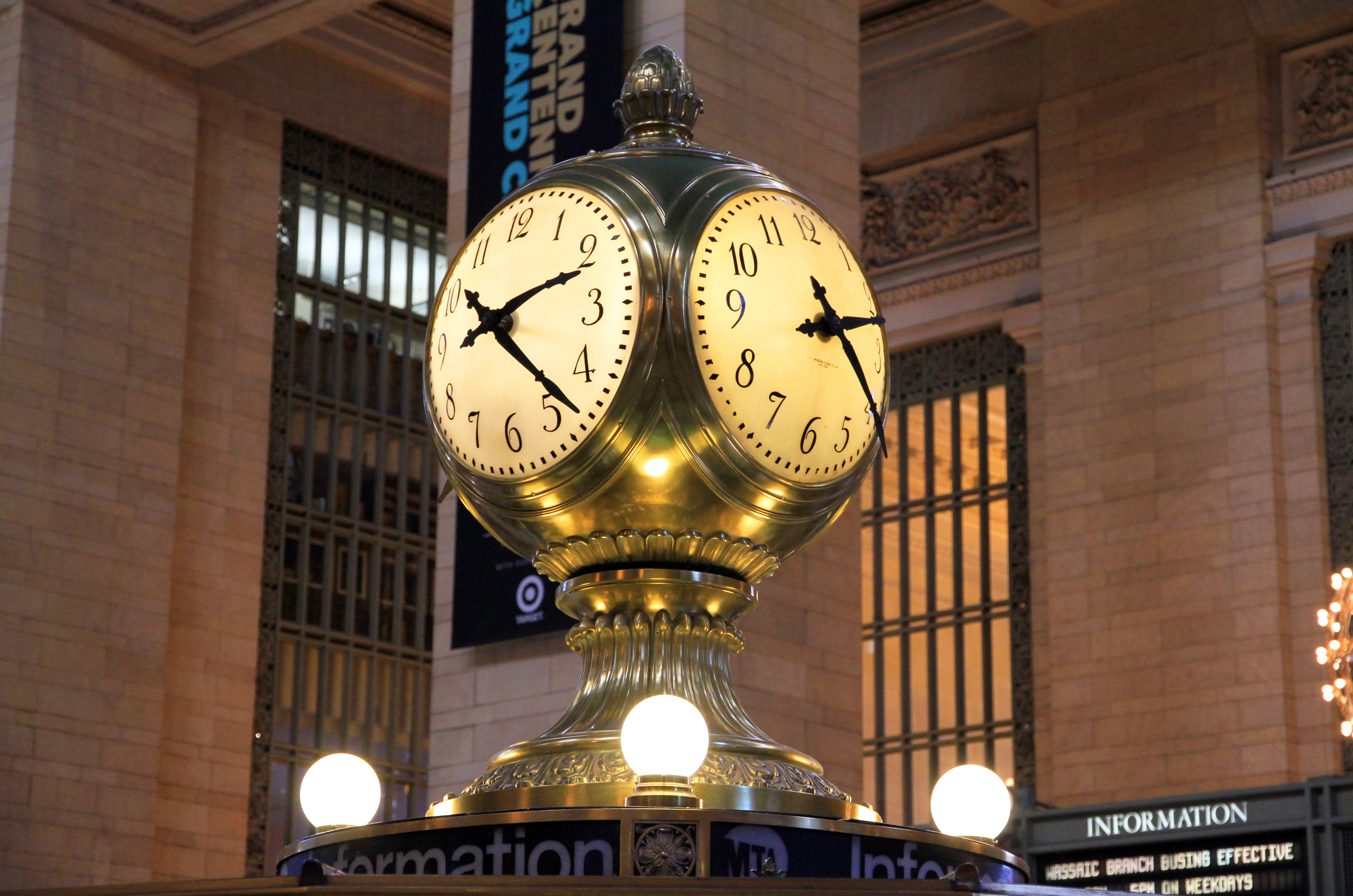
Milk glass clock faces at Grand Central Terminal in New York City

Milk glass is often used for architectural decoration when one of the underlying purposes is the display of graphic information. The original milk glass marquee of the Chicago Theatre has been donated to the Smithsonian Institution. A famous use of milk glass is for the four faces of the information booth clock at Grand Central Terminal in New York City. Barbetta, the New York Italian restaurant founded in 1906 and still in business as of 2026, has what is said to be the last opal glass sign in the city.

== Collectible ==
Milk glass has a considerable following of collectors. Glass makers continue to produce both original pieces and reproductions of popular collectible pieces and patterns.

== Notable U.S. manufacturers ==
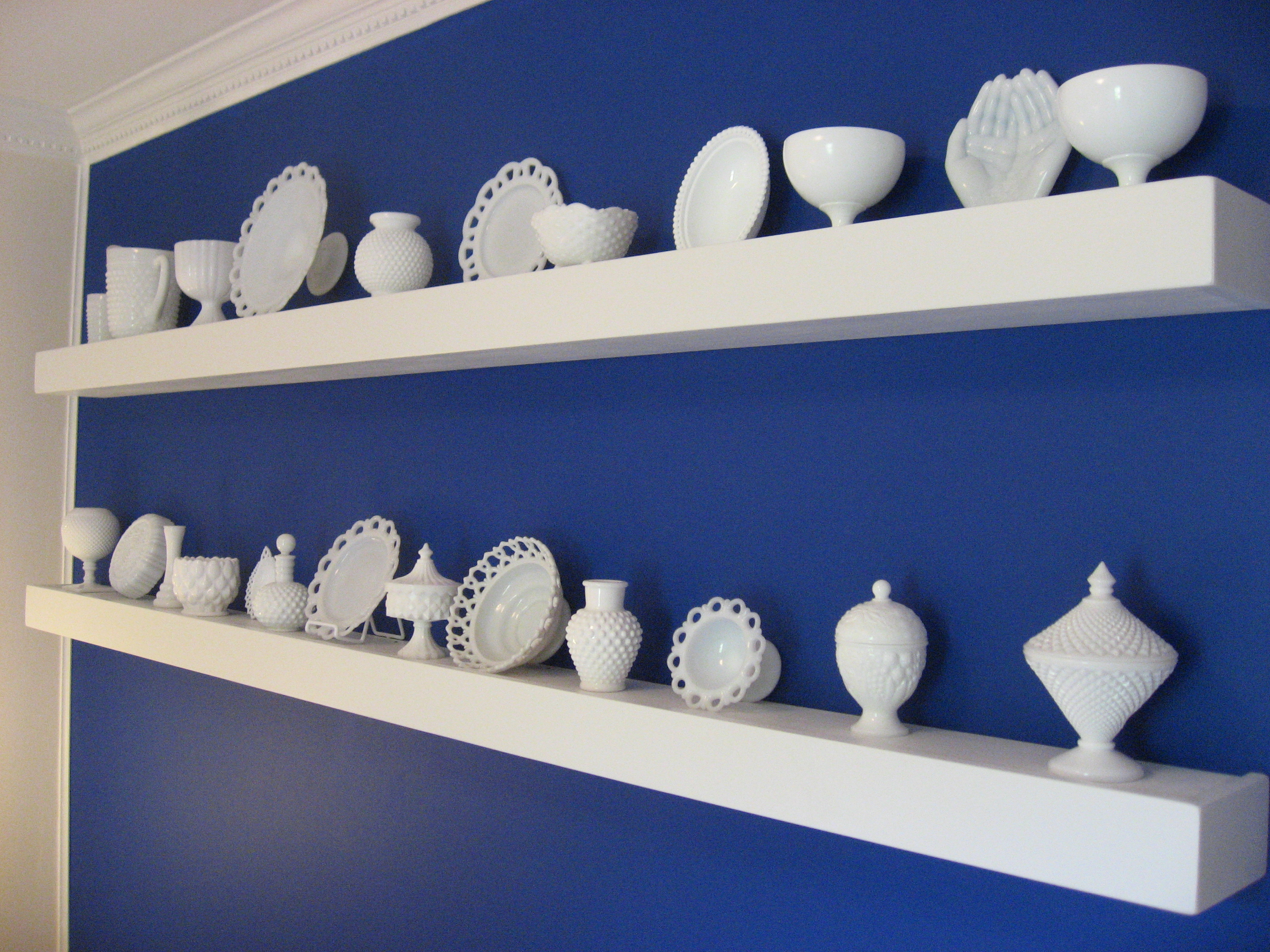
A milk glass collection

- Dithridge & Company
- Fenton Glass Company
- Fostoria Glass Company
- Imperial Glass Company
- Kanawha Glass Co.
- L.E. Smith Glass Company
- Mosser Glass
- Thai Soojung Glass Company Limited
- Westmoreland Glass Company

== See also ==
- Opaline glass
