= Appert Frères =

- Founded: 1832
- Defunct: 1931

Appert Frères was a French company specializing in glassware, active from 1832 to 1947.

== History ==
The company was founded in 1832 in Clichy-la-Garenne by Louis-Adrien Appert (1788 – 1866) as the "Maison Appert". In 1858 it took the name "Appert et Fils" when the founder's two sons, Adrien-Antoine (1836 – 1902) and Léon-Alfred Appert (1837 – 1925), became involved. In 1865 Louis-Adrien withdrew from glassmaking and the company was renamed "Appert Frères".

The original business supplied raw materials such as coloured crystals and enamel for smaller glass products. Much of the activity was selling semi-finished products to finishing workshops. The Appert brothers started to work with and sell finished products on behalf of glass designers. Their best known client was Eugène Rousseau who worked in the Japonism style.

Léon-Alfred Appert trained at the École Centrale Paris and introduced a major innovation to the world of glassblowing with the use of compressed air. Although he managed to mechanize the work of the glass blower, the technique was not widely taken up because of the high cost of investment.

Léon-Alfred's son Leopold Antonin (1867 – 1931) succeeded him in the running of the business and was in turn succeeded by his brother Maurice-Adrien (1869 – 1941). The company was dissolved in 1947.

== Gallery ==
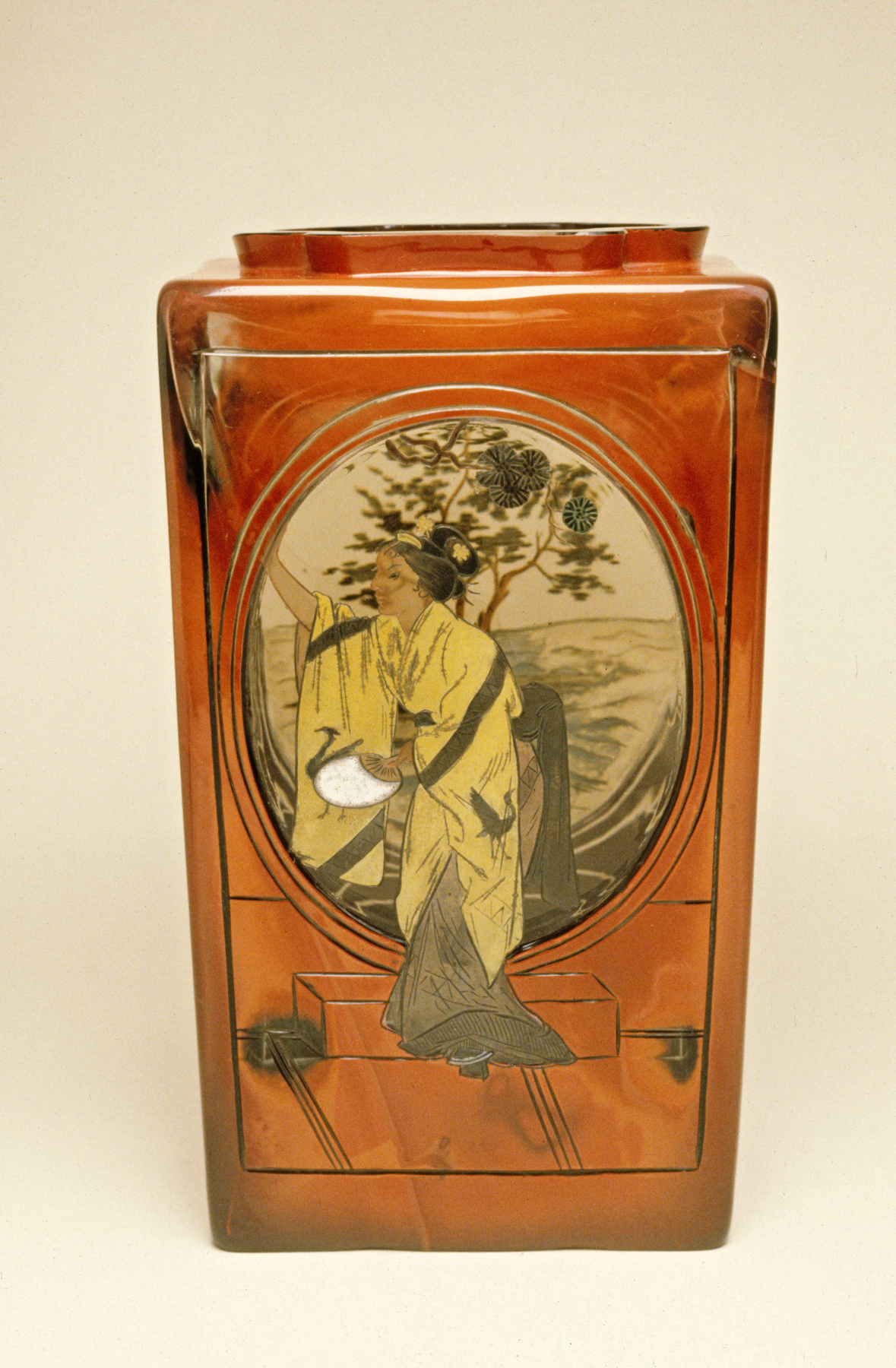
Rousseau-designed vase (1878–84)
Layered glass, lacquer, red enamel
Walters Art Museum, Baltimore

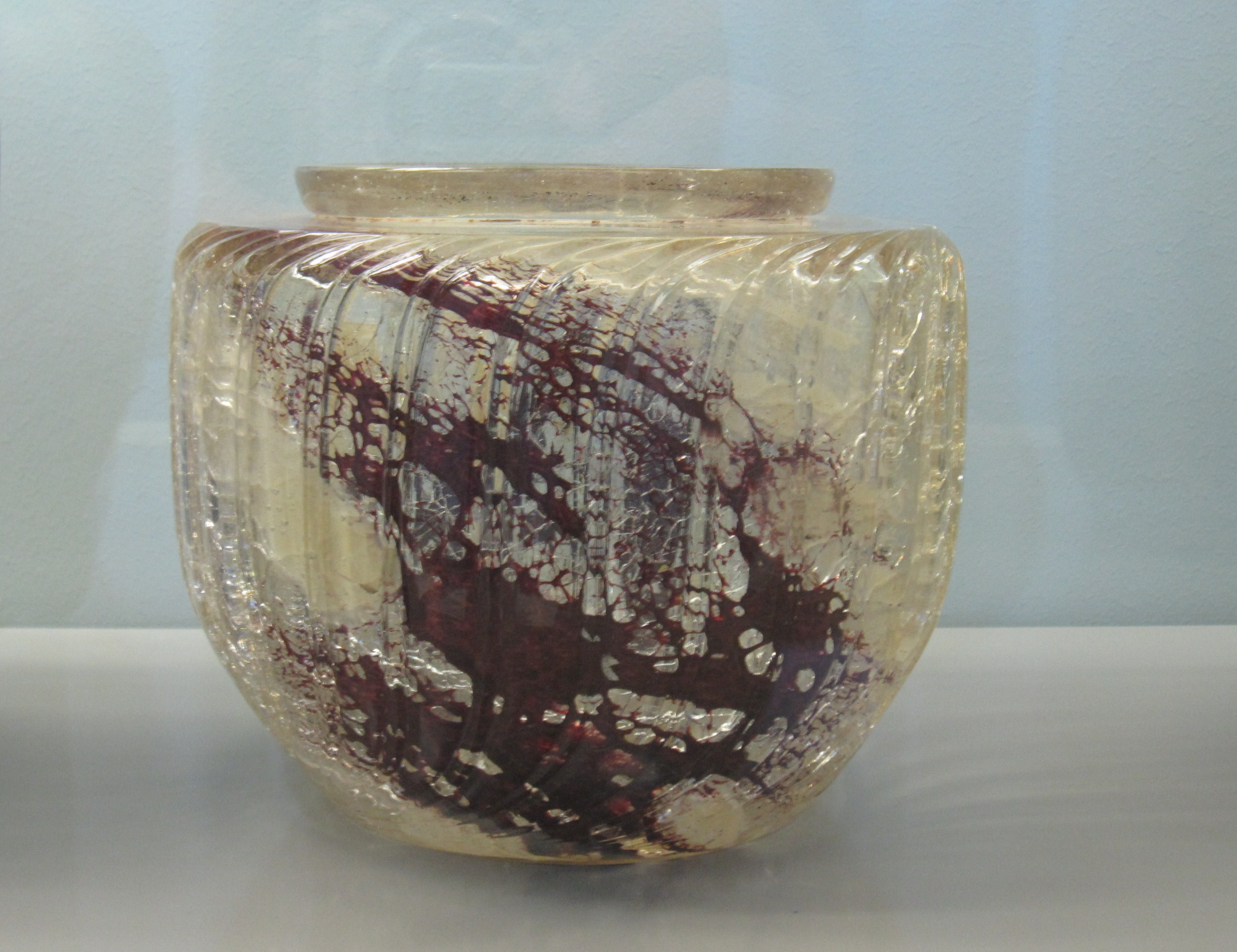
Leveillé-designed vase (1885–90)
Kunstgewerbemuseum Berlin

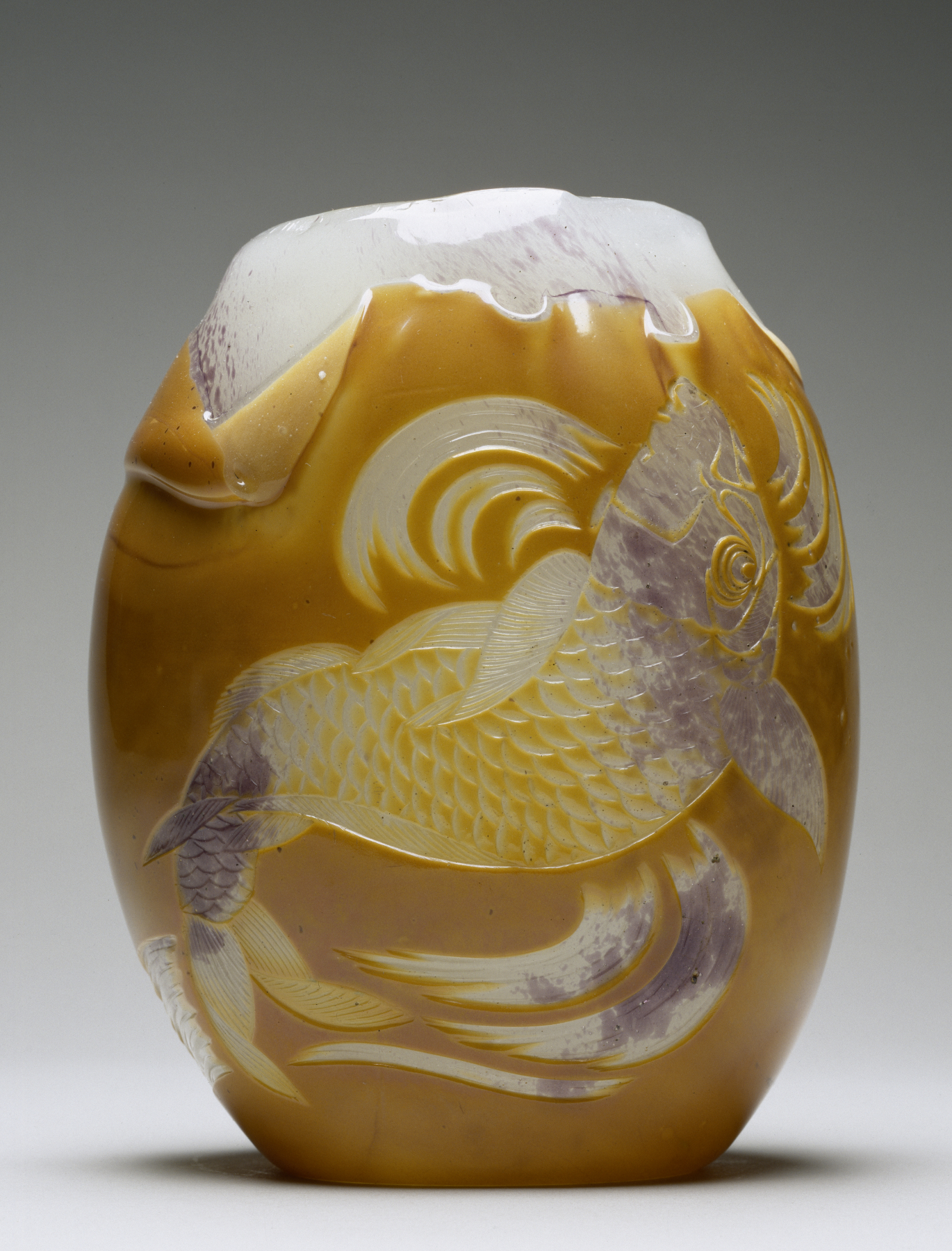
Rousseau-designed carp vase (1878–84)
Layered and engraved glass
Walters Art Museum

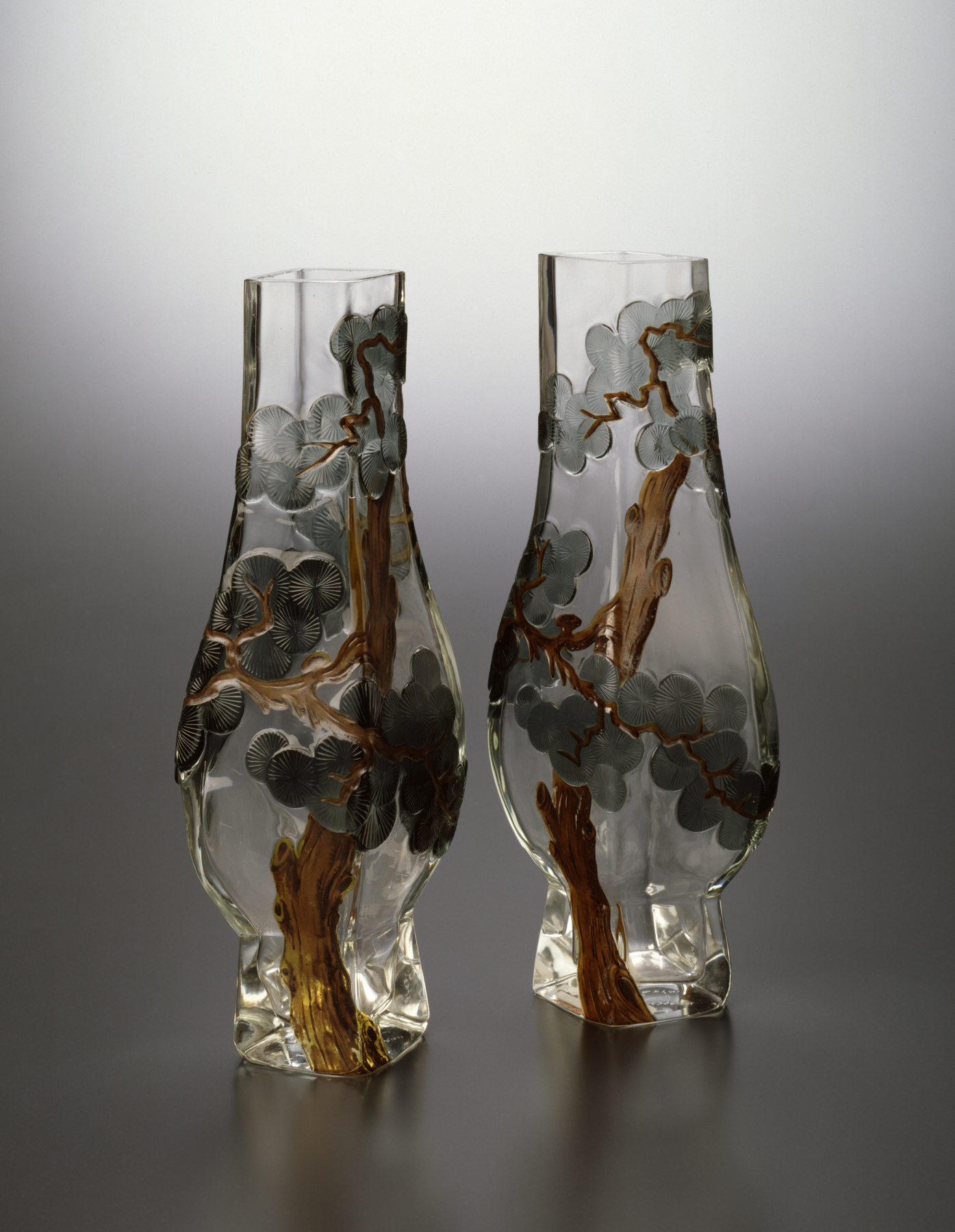
Rousseau-designed pair of pine tree vases (1878–84)
Rousseau has adopted the cameo technique found in 18th-century Chinese glass. The Japanese-inspired pine tree designs have been created by cutting away portions of the surface of the glass to reveal the different colours within.
Walters Art Museum
