= Old Dominion Glass Company =

American glass manufacturer

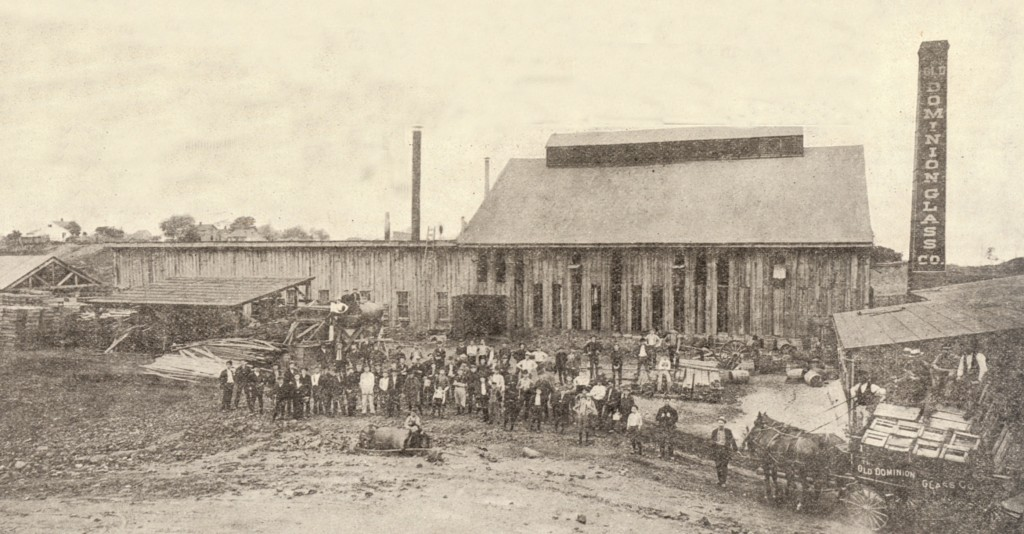
Old Dominion Glass Company factory, Alexandria, circa 1907

The Old Dominion glass factory operated from 1901 to 1925 in Alexandria, Virginia. The company specialized in beer, medicine, and soda bottles, as well as novelty items. Both black and white workers were employed in the factory, but there is little information on whether they worked side by side.

In 1911, Lewis Hine photographed some of the child workers in the factory for his exposé of child labor. The factory was later destroyed by fire in 1925. The property can be found at North Fairfax and Montgomery streets.
