= Carr Lowrey Glass Company =

Defunct company in Baltimore, Maryland, US

Carr Lowrey Glass Company (1889–2003) was a manufacturer of glass bottles.

== Establishment ==
Carr Lowrey Glass Company founded in Baltimore, Maryland in 1889. Located on the Middle Branch of the Patapsco River in a neighborhood named Westport, Samuel Carr and William Lowrey established their company to create glass bottles for the pharmaceutical and perfume industries. As seen from the locally famous Hanover Street Bridge, just west of Fort McHenry, you could see the towering smoke stacks and piles of discarded blue glass the factory.

Their company grew over the years as they were one of the first companies to utilize an "IS Machine," a machine that had individual sections that were timed to automatically blow and move the bottles to a conveyor system.

In 1944, they were acquired by the Anchor-Hocking Glass Company. During this time, the company experienced major expansion. Carr-Lowrey was one of the producers of the famous Avon bottles that were shaped like cars, planes, animals, and also white glass shampoo bottles for Head & Shoulders, as well as facial cream bottles for Procter & Gamble.

== Plastic bottles ==
As the global economy moved toward plastic bottles after World War II, the company's began to see fewer orders. To make matters worse, the company's glorified 6-Tank was shut down during a strike and was never restarted. Ownership of the company changed hands several times as the company struggled to find its niche. Moreover, Carr Lowrey had formidable competition in New Jersey with Wheaton Glass and from foreign companies such as St. Gobain in France and Rocco Bormioli in Italy. St. Gobain eventually opened a plant in Georgia, which spelled doom for Carr-Lowrey.

The Abell Foundation, a local Baltimore philanthropy, loaned Carr-Lowrey money in an effort to keep an historic business in Baltimore alive. Unfortunately, Carr-Lowrey was never able to remain profitable and eventually closed its doors in 2003.

== Rebirth ==
The image of Baltimore as a rusting industrial city seems to be fading. The city's downtown is now vibrant with activity from financial companies and bio-technology from nearby Johns Hopkins University and the University of Maryland at Baltimore. With this rebirth of the city, the waterfront property in and around town has become desired property for developers. The land once occupied by Carr-Lowrey Glass Company is now slated for waterfront housing. With Baltimore's Light Rail running right next to the property, a nearby exit to I-95, and a main road straight into downtown, the former Carr-Lowrey Glass Company site is considered by many an ideal place for residential and commercial development.

In 2004, Patrick Turner, owner of Turner Development Company, purchased the property once occupied by Carr Lowrey. He soon purchased the electric generating plant next door that was owned by Baltimore Gas & Electric.
