= United States Glass Company =

American glassmaking conglomerate

The United States Glass Company was a trust formed by the combination of numerous glass companies. The factories were located from western Pennsylvania to Indiana.

== History ==
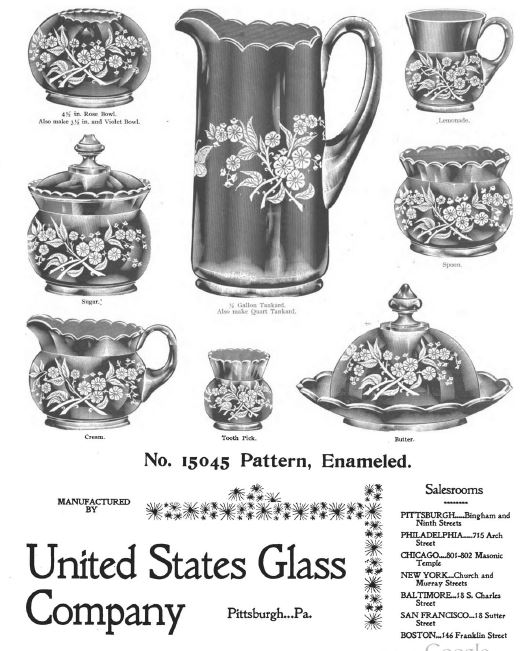
Advertisement for glassware made by the United States Glass Company.

On February 9, 1891, The New York Times reported on the founding of the company, which included seventeen factories. After the companies combined, two new plants were built. One, an automatic facility, was constructed at Gas City, Indiana. A hand-worked glass operation was also added at Tiffin, Ohio. The plants all received a letter designation. The main office started at South 9th and Bingham Streets, Pittsburgh, PA, in the former Ripley Glass facility, and moved to Tiffin in 1938. Over time, the factories closed until only the Tiffin plant survived. The company went bankrupt in 1963, with the Tiffin plant reorganizing as the "Tiffin Art Glass Company". The other plant which survived to that point was the Glassport, Pennsylvania, plant. It was closed after a storm on August 3, 1963, which resulted in the factory's water tower collapsing through the plant roof. The glass furnaces cooled and hardened, and it was not cost-effective to remove the 250 ton hardened glass and make the repairs that would have been needed to restart the facility.

== Specialties ==
- Tiffin produced quality glassware with delicate etchings. They were known for their use of color.
- The Gas City branch produced machine made kitchenware and dinnerware in colored glass through the 1930s.
- The factories in Pittsburgh were known for their decorating. They decorated lamps, tableware and a large line of colored glassware and crystal.

== Factory locations ==
- Factory A - Adams & Co., Pittsburgh, Pennsylvania (1891-?) S. 10th and Sarah Sts.
- Factory B - Bryce Brothers, Pittsburgh, Pennsylvania (1891-?) S. 21st and Wharton Sts.
- Factory C - Challinor, Taylor & Co., Tarentum, Pennsylvania (1891-?)
- Factory D - George Duncan & Sons Glass, Pittsburgh, Pennsylvania, (1891–1892, destroyed by fire) S. 10th St. near Carson St.
- Factory E - Richards & Hartley, Tarentum, Pennsylvania (1891–1893)
- Factory F - Ripley Glass, Pittsburgh, Pennsylvania (1891-)? S. 8th and Bingham Sts.
- Factory G - Gillinder, Greensburg, Pennsylvania (1891–1900)
- Factory H - Hobbs Glass Co., Wheeling, West Virginia (1891-1893)
- Factory J - Columbia Glass, Findlay, Ohio (1891-?)
- Factory K - King Glass, Pittsburgh, Pennsylvania (1891-1930s?) Foot of S. 18th St.
- Factory L - O'Hara Glass Co., Pittsburgh, Pennsylvania (1891–1893) 30th St. and A.V.R.R.
- Factory M - Bellaire Goblet Co., Findlay, Ohio, (1891–1892)
- Factory N - Nickel Plate Glass, Fostoria, Ohio (1891–1894)
- Factory O - Central Glass, Wheeling, West Virginia (1891–1895, then resold)
- Factory P - Doyle & Co., Pittsburgh, Pennsylvania (1891-?) S. 10th and Washington Sts.
- Factory R - A. J. Beatty & Sons, Tiffin, Ohio (1892–1963, rebuilt 1893)
- Factory S - A. J. Beatty & Sons, Steubenville, Ohio (1892-?)
- Factory T - Novelty Glass Company, Fostoria, Ohio (1892-1893)
- Factory U - Gas City, Indiana (1894-?)
- Factory GP - Glassport, Pennsylvania (1895–1963, destroyed by tornado August 3, 1963)
