= Dunbar Glass =

Glassmaking company in Dunbar, West Virginia

Dunbar Glass Corporation
- Industry: Glassmaking
- Founded: 1911 in Dunbar, West Virginia
- Defunct: 1955
- Number of employees: 200 (1952)

Dunbar Glass Corporation was a glassmaking company in Dunbar, West Virginia.

== History ==
Founded as Dunbar Flint Glass Company in 1912, the company originally produced lamp chimneys but by the 1920s the company had expanded into giftware, bareware, tableware, and lighting goods. In 1923, the company was renamed to the Dunbar Flint Glass Corporation, and later Dunbar Glass Corporation. By 1953, the company was only producing glass tubing, before production ceased entirely in 1955.

Some of the company's craftsmen formed Kanawha Glass Company when the Dunbar Glass company folded.
