= Jack K. Paquette =

US historian and author (1925–2014)

- Born: August 14, 1925; Toledo, Ohio
- Died: December 5, 2014 (aged 89)
- Occupations: corporate management, author
- Years active: 33+
- Known for: public affairs and communications, author
- Notable work: The Glassmakers: a History of Owens-Illinois Incorporated, Blowpipes: Northwest Ohio Glassmaking in the Gas Boom of the 1880s

Jack K. Paquette (August 14, 1925 – December 5, 2014) was a historian, author, and retired vice president of US glass company Owens–Illinois. He was born in East Toledo, Ohio, and attended the Ohio State University where he earned a Bachelor of Arts degree in journalism in 1949 and a Master of Arts degree in political science in 1951. After graduation he began a 33–year career with Owens–Illinois, one of the largest glass bottle manufacturers in the world. By 1970 he was vice president of the overall company and director of the Corporate Relations Department. He retired in 1984. During his retirement, he wrote six books about life in Northwest Ohio, including four related to glassmaking.

== Early life and education ==
Jack K. Paquette was born on August 14, 1925, in East Toledo, Ohio. At the age of 17 he enlisted in the U.S. Navy and served for three years, including active duty in the Pacific Theater during World War II. After the war, he enrolled at the Ohio State University. While a student, he worked as a news editor for the university newspaper and as a copy editor for the local Columbus newspaper. He received a Bachelor of Arts degree in journalism in 1949, and a Master of Arts in political science in 1951. Following graduation in 1951, he joined the Owens–Illinois advertising department.

== Glass company career ==
Beginning as a creative writing specialist, Paquette began a 33–year career with Owens–Illinois. The company was founded by Michael J. Owens, and is one of the largest bottle manufacturers in the world. (Note: Michael J. Owens revolutionized the glass bottle industry by inventing a machine that would make bottles at high speed and low cost with consistency in size and shape. Not only did Owens' invention lower costs, it also opened new markets where low cost bottles with consistent size could be used as containers for products that previously had limited distribution. Owens was also involved with improving a machine for producing window glass, which changed the way window glass was produced.) Paquette began working in the company's Glass Container Division and Corporate Marketing Department. In December 1961 it was announced that Paquette was promoted to a newly created position of Advertising and Sales Promotion Manager of the Libbey Glass Division of Owens–Illinois. In August 1964 he was promoted to manager of customer marketing services for the Glass Container Division of Owens–Illinois. Three years later, during November 1967, he was promoted to director of organization planning for Owens–Illinois' corporate planning department. He was also assigned to assist the company's president and chief executive officer.

It was announced in April 1970 that Paquette was elected vice president of Owens–Illinois, Inc. (the overall company). In addition to that position, he would continue as director of corporate relations. In January 1981 he was named assistant to the chairman of Owens–Illinois. In May 1972 Paquette, as vice president corporate relations, accepted the Public Relations Society of America's Silver Anvil Award on behalf of Owens–Illinois. The award is for efforts to improve the environment, and is called the "Oscar" of public relations. In June 1983 Paquette, as vice president and assistant to the executive office, accepted a national Business in the Arts Award from the Business Committee for the Arts on behalf of Owens–Illinois. He retired in 1984 after 33 years with Owens–Illinois, although he would serve as a consultant. By that time, he was recognized as "a nationally known authority on public affairs and communications". Following retirement, he formed Paquette Enterprises, which was a consulting, retailing, and publishing firm. That firm was listed in the D&B Million Dollar Directory.

== Private life ==
Paquette was married and had four children. He was a co–founder the Columbus and Northwestern Ohio chapters of the national Society of Professional Journalists, formerly known as Sigma Delta Chi. He was also a founding director of the Toledo Press Club. Among the numerous civic organizations he was involved with were the Boy Scouts of America, the Western Lake Erie Historical Society, the American Red Cross, and the United Way. In December 1980 he was elected national chairman of Keep America Beautiful. A long time writer, Paquette was the author of numerous articles and six books on Northwest Ohio's history. (Note: Paquette's six books, in order of release, were: A History of Owens–Illinois Inc.; The Glassmakers: A History of Owens–Illinois Incorporated; Blowpipes: Northwest Ohio Glassmaking in the Gas Boom of the 1880s; A Boy's Journey Through the Great Depression; The Glassmakers Revisited; and Small Town Girl: And Other Stories About Ordinary People Who Led Extraordinary Lives.) His research papers, 11 linear feet of papers known as the Jack Paquette Collection on Northwest Ohio's Glass Industry, 1885–2003, are available at the Ward M. Canaday Center for Special Collections at the University of Toledo. Paquette died on December 5, 2014.

== Notes ==
=== References ===
- Bredehoft, Neila M.; Bredehoft, Thomas H. (1997). Hobbs, Brockunier and Co., Glass: Identification and Value Guide. Paducah, KY: Collector Books. ISBN 978-0-89145-780-0. OCLC 37340501.
- Skrabec, Quentin R. (2007). Michael Owens and the Glass Industry. Gretna, Louisiana: Pelican Publishing. OCLC 137341537.
