= Victor Insulators =

American ceramics manufacturer

Victor Insulators, Inc.
- Industry: Ceramics industry
- Founded: 1893; 133 years ago
- Founder: Fred M. Locke
- Headquarters: Victor, New York
- Products: Insulators
- Website: www.victorinsulators.com

Victor Insulators, Inc. is the oldest electrical insulator manufacturer in North America.

== History ==
=== Locke Insulator Manufacturing Company ===
Fred M. Locke, the company's founder, had been interested in designing and manufacturing insulators since 1883, when he was employed as a telegraph operator for the New York Central and Hudson River Railroad. He noticed that the company's insulators would often become wet or damp, causing electrical leakage and line failure. On one occasion he was accused of falling asleep at his station due to the telegraph line going dead from faulty insulators and he became interested in designing a stronger insulator.

In 1889 he was granted a patent for a triple petticoat glass insulator with an interior dowel. He licensed this design to companies such as E.S. Greeley & Company and the Brookfield Glass Company.

Locke built a factory in Victor, New York, in 1893. He used the factory as a location for both his manufacturing operation, and as an office for his jobbing business. Soon after starting the company, Locke began to investigate porcelain insulators for emerging high-voltage power lines. After outsourcing dry and wet process porcelain from other companies, Locke began to manufacture his own wet process porcelain insulators at the Victor plant. A few years later, in 1902, the company was incorporated as the Locke Insulator Manufacturing Company. Locke retired from the company in 1903.

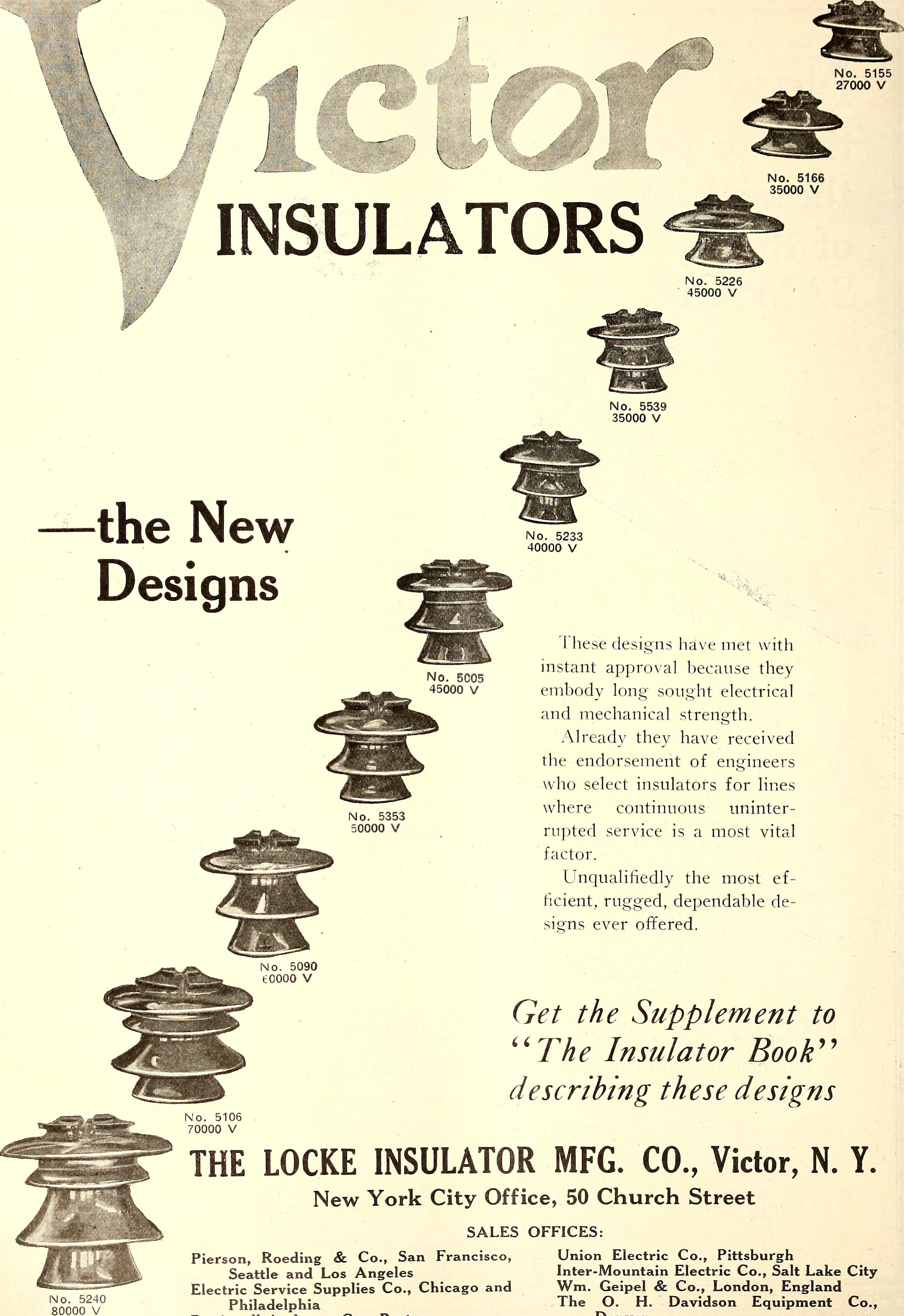
1917 advertisement for Victor Insulators

=== Victor Insulators ===
The Locke Insulator Manufacturing Company suspended operations in 1932 due to the Great Depression. A group of local investors came together to finance the start of a new company in 1935, securing all company shares in three days. The company was renamed Victor Insulators, which had previously been used as a trade name by the Locke company.

During World War II Victor branched into the production of sanitaryware, first for the US Military and then for wider commercial sale. The company's original coffee mug design went on to become a diner staple.

In 1953 Victor Insulators was purchased by the I-T-E Circuit Breaker Company, a manufacturer of electrical distribution equipment. The following year, Victor began producing a high-strength switch and bus insulator line for rail systems and other transportation industries. The company's Victor, New York, plant was expanded during the 1960s and later drew criticism for polluting the local river. In response, the company installed a waste water treatment and disposal system in 1970.

I-T-E was purchased by Gould, Inc. in 1976, and the Victor operation was renamed the Gould Inc., Insulators Division. Brown Boveri & Cie purchased the factory in 1981.

In 1984, company employees purchased the company from Brown Boveri and resumed operating under the name of Victor Insulators.

Victor Insulators filed for Chapter 11 bankruptcy in 2008 after experiencing substantial financial losses from a variety of factors such as employee pension plan costs, rising foreign competition, natural gas costs, and increasing transportation expenses. After a reorganization, the company managed to recover and continue operating as one of only three porcelain insulator companies remaining in the United States.

== Products ==
=== Coffee mugs ===
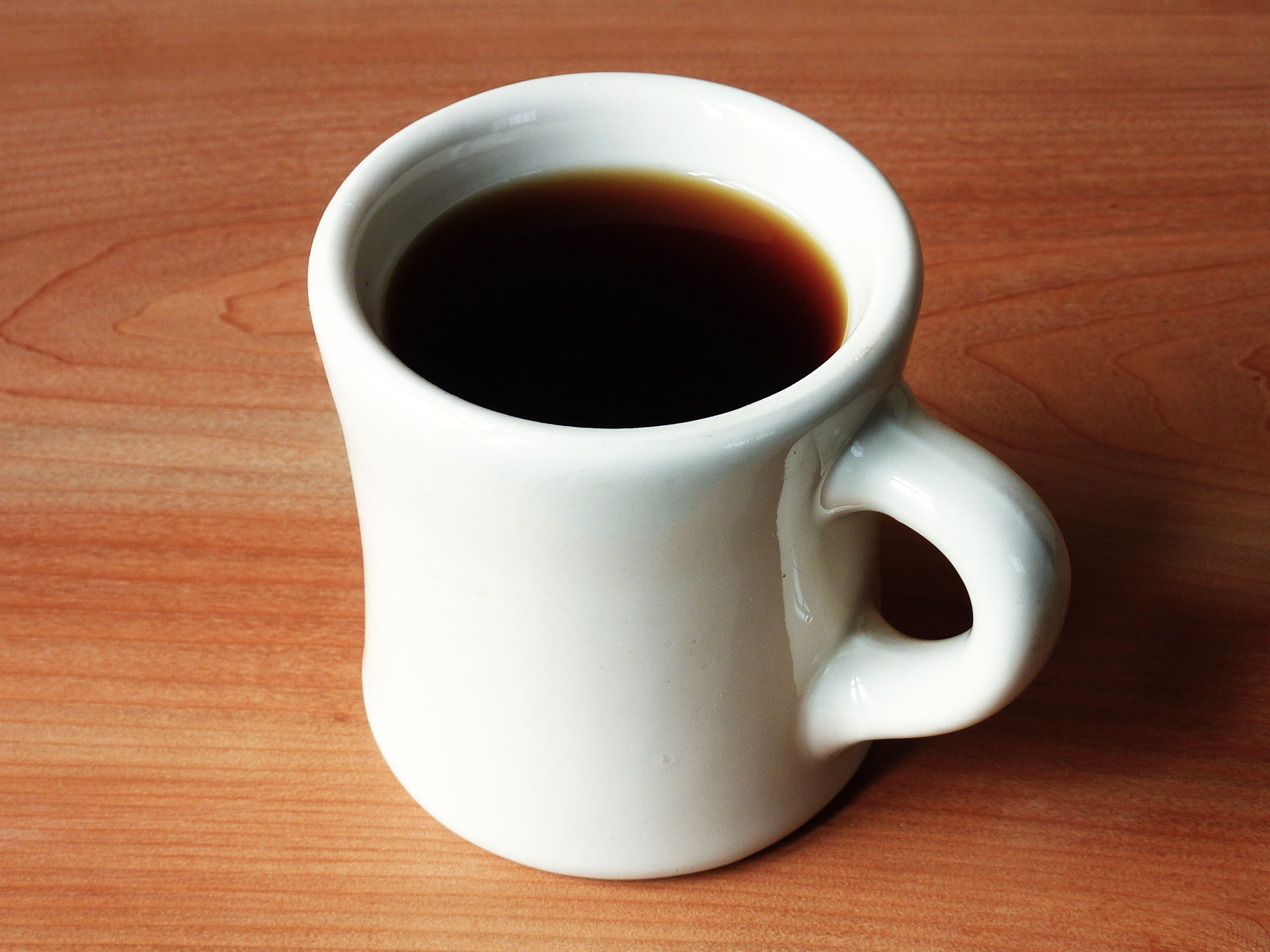
Victor coffee mug

During World War II, the company responded to a request from the United States Navy to develop dining ware that was sturdy and wouldn't slide easily on ship tables. The company developed a bowl and dual-wall coffee mug with the same porcelain used to make insulators.

Victor won the government contract and later discovered an even larger secondary market when their coffee mug design quickly caught on in restaurants and diners. The classic thick-walled, heavy duty "diner service ware", now considered an iconic design, is the result of that original Victor service ware. Their diner-style coffee mug was widely imitated and copied by other manufacturers.

By the 1980s, Victor found they struggled to compete with the price of foreign counterfeits on the market. In 1986 they began to mark "Made in USA" on the base of mugs to set them apart from competitors, but demand continued to decline until the company was forced to cease production of the mugs in spring of 1990.
