= John M. Whitall =

American businessman

John Mickle Whitall
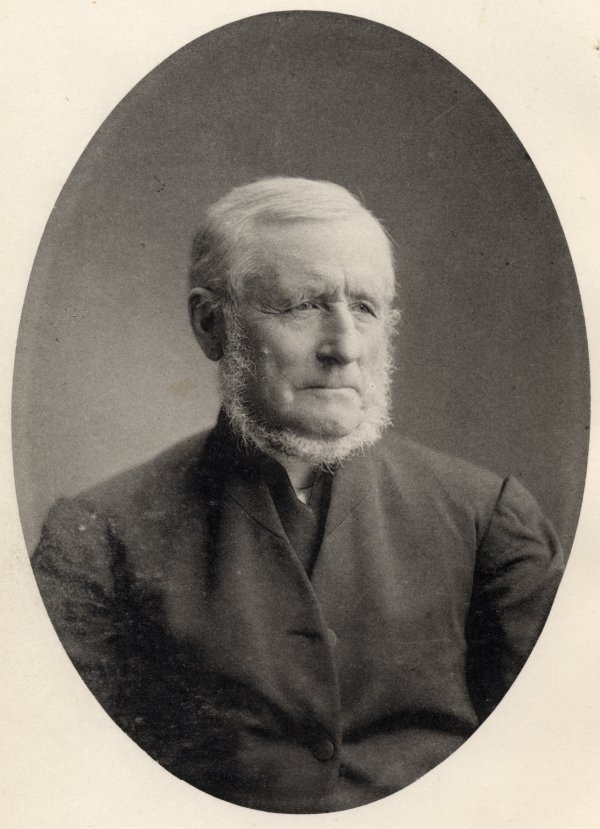
- Born: November 4, 1800; Woodbury, New Jersey, U.S.
- Died: June 6, 1877 (aged 76); Atlantic City, New Jersey, U.S.
- Occupation: Businessman
- Spouse: Mary Tatum
- Children: Hannah, Sarah, Mary, James

John Mickle Whitall (November 4, 1800 – June 6, 1877) was an American sea captain, businessman and philanthropist in New Jersey and Pennsylvania involved in the spice and silk trade, glass-making, and missionary work.

== Early years ==
Whitall was born in Woodbury, New Jersey, in 1800 into a Quaker family and was obliged to drop schooling at the age of 15, when due to a business loss the family was forced to sell their home and move to a farm outside of Woodbury. Whitall worked as a farmhand for a year but found the life hard and uninspiring. At age 16, he apprenticed as a ship hand on the William Savery, for a 1-year voyage to Calcutta, India, and in 1818, for another voyage on the same ship carrying cotton from Charleston, South Carolina, to Liverpool, England. On board the ship, Whitall wore plain Quaker dress, avoided the common use of profane language, and was an outspoken advocate of honesty and respectful dealing with everyone on board. On his third voyage, in 1819, from Liverpool to Canton, China, the ship's captain asked him to help make a nautical observation, and after performing this duty well, he was taught navigation. On his fourth voyage, to Calcutta and Madras in 1820, the ship was capsized by a squall and demasted, losing some of the sailors. At Calcutta, due to his good performance and ill health of one of the ship's officers, he was promoted to Second Mate and gained the respect of the ordinary sailors by treating them well. On his fifth voyage in 1822, to Canton, he was chief mate on the ship Dorothea, and on his sixth and seventh voyages, to Antwerp and the far east, he was chief mate on the ship America. These voyages, carrying items such as ginseng, silk, and spices, were profitable for the owners and the ship's officers.

== Career ==
=== Ship captain ===
In 1824, Whitall was contracted by Whitton Evans to oversee the construction of a new sailing ship, New Jersey, the largest Indiaman yet constructed in Philadelphia, and was given command as captain. Whitall was a ship's captain at age 24, which was unusual for the time. Because the ship sailed through distant relatively unknown waters in a time when privateering and piracy was common, it was required to carry arms, which initially caused Whitall some consternation because at that time Quaker society generally prohibited carrying arms. The young captain decided to forbid the sailors on board from using profane language, and this worked to his advantage when dealing with men older and more experienced. The voyage to Canton was uneventful, and the ship returned to Philadelphia in April 1826. He made two more very profitable but anxious voyages as captain of the New Jersey carrying ginseng to Canton, returning with silk and tea. The voyage to Canton lasted about four months and the selling and buying of cargo took 2 months, giving each trip a total duration of about ten months. Due to the danger and hardship of life at sea, Whitall had been undecided about whether to continue as a ship's captain. Upon returning to Philadelphia in 1829, Whitall found that the ship's owner Whitton Evans had died, and the ship was then sold.

=== Philadelphia businessman ===
With his savings from his life at sea, in 1829 Whitall entered into the dry goods business in Center City Philadelphia. Whitall had courted Mary Tatum during his interludes in Philadelphia between ship voyages and he proposed in 1829. She was the daughter of John and Hannah Tatum of Woodbury, New Jersey and a friend of Whitall's family from his childhood. They were married at a Friends Meeting in Woodbury, New Jersey on November 5, 1830, and lived with his parents in Cemnter City Philadelphia but soon after found another residence nearby. He went into partnership for five years but found the dry goods business meager for his needs because he was accustomed to dealing with men on board ship and a little more excitement.

Being relatively uneducated and naive to the business world, Whitall attempted to deal in business honestly but found that some of his business clients had taken unfair advantage of him. Instead of attempting to secure further loans, Whitall in 1837 chose to sell out and settle with his creditors. He found that he could only settle his accounts at 75 cents per dollar. He paid this off in a period of 12 months and promised to pay the remaining 25% with interest, which he did successfully by 1850.

=== Glass business ===
In 1838, G.M. Haverstick, Whitall's brother in law, and his partner William Scattergood offered Whitall partnership in their business manufacturing glass bottles in Millville, New Jersey. Whitall continued to live in Philadelphia and worked there at the main headquarters of the company, called "Scattergood & Whitall" after Haverstick retired. Whitall found the work agreeable and the business went well. The company manufactured bottles in special order for drug stores across the country, and perfume-makers, with the store's logo imprinted in the glass. The bottles are prized by collectors today. In 1845, Scattergood retired, and Whitall's brother Israel "Franklin" Whitall joined the partnership to oversee the work in Millville. The company rapidly expanded, developing new industrial processes, refining the recipes for glass, and discovering more efficient ways to cast bottles. During the next several years the glass business prospered and Whitall and his brother built a new storehouse at 4th and Race Streets in Philadelphia. In 1848, Edward Tatum joined the partnership and the firm was renamed Whitall, Brother & Company; in 1857, the name was changed to Whitall Tatum & Company. The company continued producing glass bottles and insulators for telegraph poles under the direction of IF Whitall and Edward Tatum and their descendants until 1938 when it was purchased by the Armstrong Cork Company.

== Family ==
In 1850, after Whitall had paid off his debts, he and family moved to a new house they had built at 1317 Filbert Street, Philadelphia, where the family resided until the 1880s. Whitall's three daughters and son were married in the period 1851–1855, living in the Delaware Valley and Baltimore. Whitall purchased a beach house at Atlantic City, New Jersey in 1856, where the family gathered in the summer. From his days as a sailor and even more as a married man with a family, Whitall was quite a reverent man. The family held Friends Meetings at their house and enjoyed inviting other summer residents to join them. In 1872, a Friends meeting house was built in Atlantic City which served well for many generations of Quakers. Whitall began speaking in Meeting from 1858 and continued this activity until near his death in 1877. Another summer residence, a farm complete with hay fields, orchard, and lake, was purchased in 1864 in Haddon Township, New Jersey, enjoyed by the whole family.

== Retirement and mission work ==
Whitall retired from the glass business in 1865 and was elected a manager of Pennsylvania Hospital in 1851. He held this position until 1867. In the period from 1861 to 1867, he served Philadelphia as an official Guardian of the Poor and aspPresident of the Board of Guardians. In 1868, Whitall became blind in one eye and had difficulty judging distance but continued in his active life in retirement. During the American Civil War from 1861 to 1865, Whitall helped poor blacks who had escaped from the South. He and his wife Mary started a First-Day School for adult religious instruction, teaching reading and interpretation of the Bible, and hiring teachers to help instruction. Whitall funded the entire school, paid stipends of money and coal to those scholars who attended consistently, and covered the rent for the Methodist Church, where the First-Day School convened. The church was located on St. Mary's Street so the school was termed St. Mary's Street School. Over the following 10 years, attendance rose consistently. By 1871, there average attendance was 175. The attendance continued to increase and Whitall continued his oversight of the school until 1874, when he had a slight stroke and became weaker. In 1876, he was unable to continue and continued to weaken until his death in 1877.
