= Whitall Tatum Company =

American glass factory

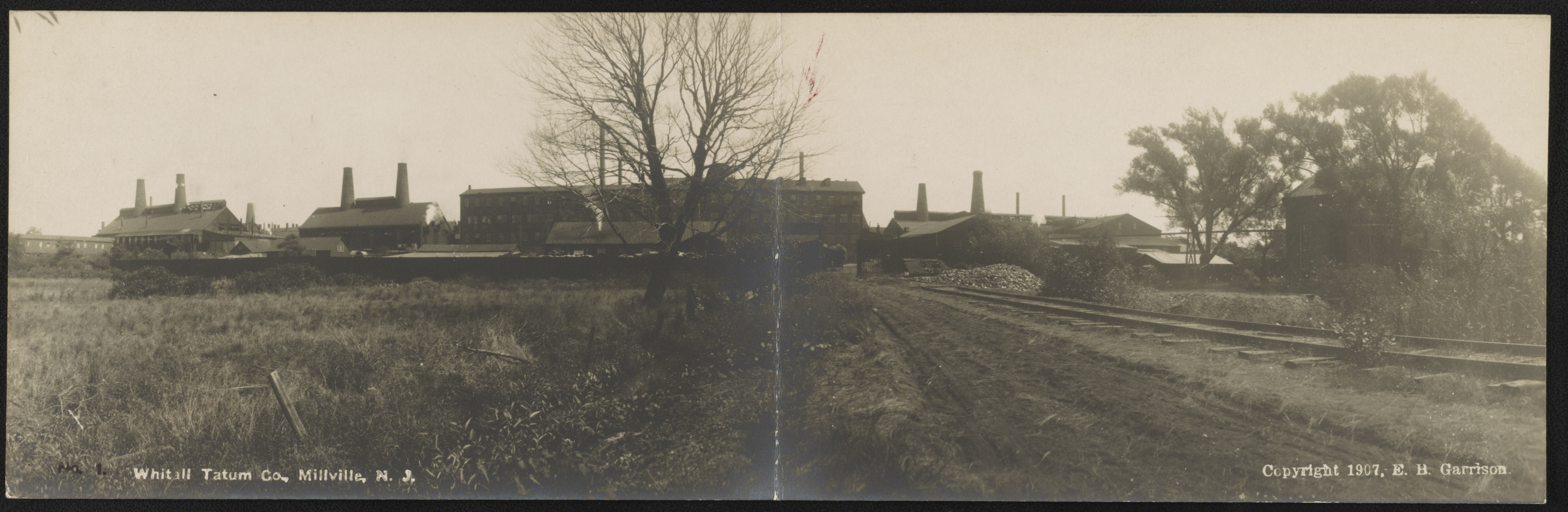
- The Whitall Tatum Company in 1907
- Formerly: Whitall, Brother & Company; Whitall Tatum & Company
- Industry: Glass
- Founded: 1806; 220 years ago
- Founders: James Lee
- Defunct: 1938; 88 years ago
- Fate: Purchased by Armstrong Cork Corporation
- Headquarters: Millville, New Jersey
- Number of locations: 1
- Area served: North America
- Products: Bottles; Pin insulators

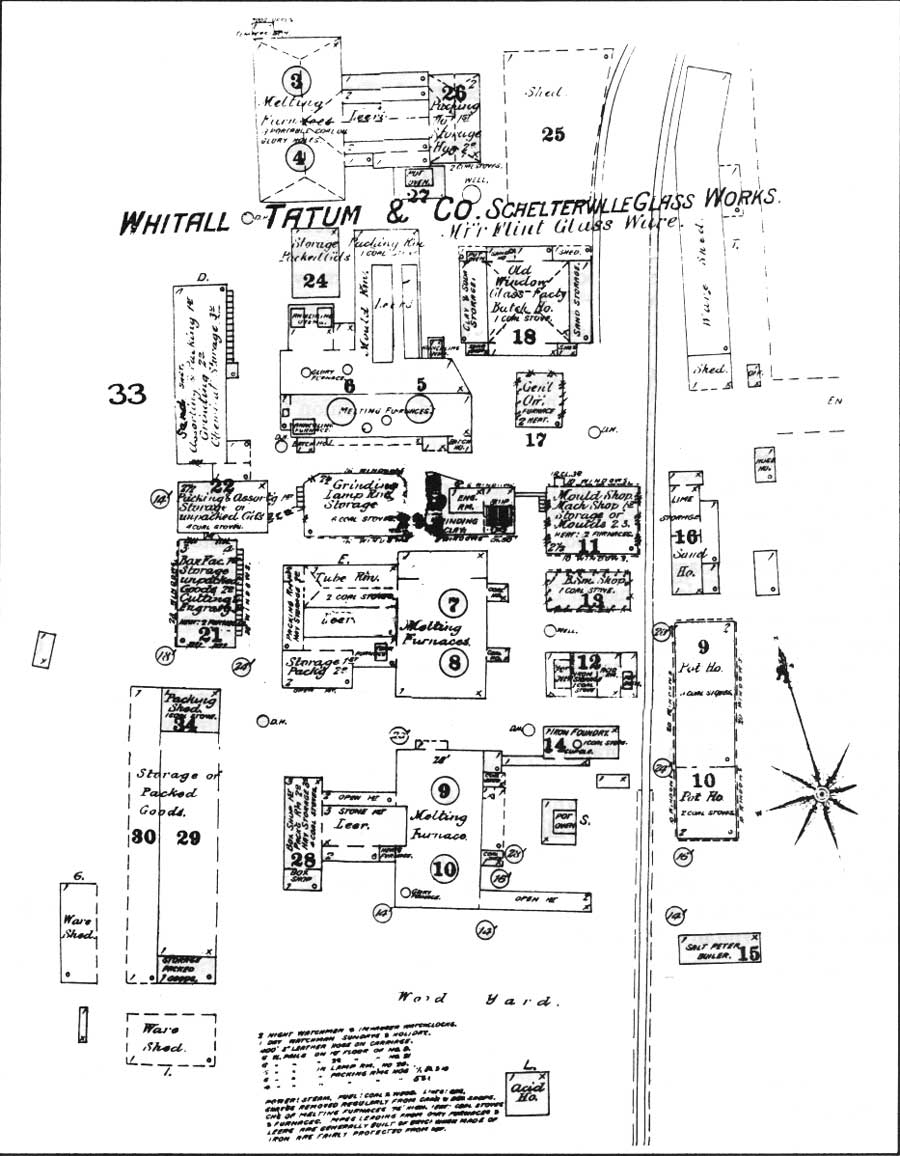
Map of the Whitall Tatum Lower Glassworks circa 1886

The Whitall Tatum Company or Whitall Tatum (1806–1938) was one of the first glass factories in the United States. Located in Millville, New Jersey, it produced bottles, jars, and glass insulators. The company was purchased by the Armstrong Cork Corporation in 1938.

== History ==
Located in Millville, New Jersey, it was in operation from 1806 through 1938. The location was ideal for making glass because silica-based sand is plentiful in southern New Jersey, the Maurice River flowing through Millville provided a source of water, and plentiful forests provided energy for industrial processes. The Millville glass works was founded by James Lee and went through several changes of ownership. In 1838, John M. Whitall became a partner in the business. He lived in Philadelphia and worked at the company's headquarters there. In 1845, after his brother Israel Franklin Whitall joined, the firm became Whitall, Brother & Company. Later, Edward Tatum also joined the partnership and in 1857 the name was again changed to Whitall Tatum & Company and later in 1901 to Whitall Tatum Company. I.F. Whitall and Edward Tatum headed the company after John M. Whitall retired in 1865, and the ownership was passed to their descendants.

Whitall Tatum produced bottles, jars, and vials throughout much of the 19th century. Antique bottle collectors prize the Whitall Tatum druggist, perfume, chemical, reagent bottles, and other types of bottles. The company developed several innovations in formulas used to make the glass, and in the manufacturing methods for bottles. At first, bottles were cast in metal molds, which left a casting line, and later ceramic and wood casts were developed for flint glass which allowed the glass to be molded without a casting line. Glass types included flint glass, blue and green glass, and artistic colored swirls, used for decoration and paperweights often made by the glass workers during their lunch hour.

Whitall Tatum mass-produced special-order prescription bottles for hundreds of pharmacies, such as Smith & Hodgson in downtown Philadelphia, embossed with their names and addresses and also marked "W.T. & Co." on the base. These mostly date from 1875 up to 1900. In 1901, the company name was changed to Whitall Tatum Company and the base marking became "W.T.CO.", and for a decade from the 1920s on, the trademark became a "W" and "T" inside a triangle.

=== Insulators ===
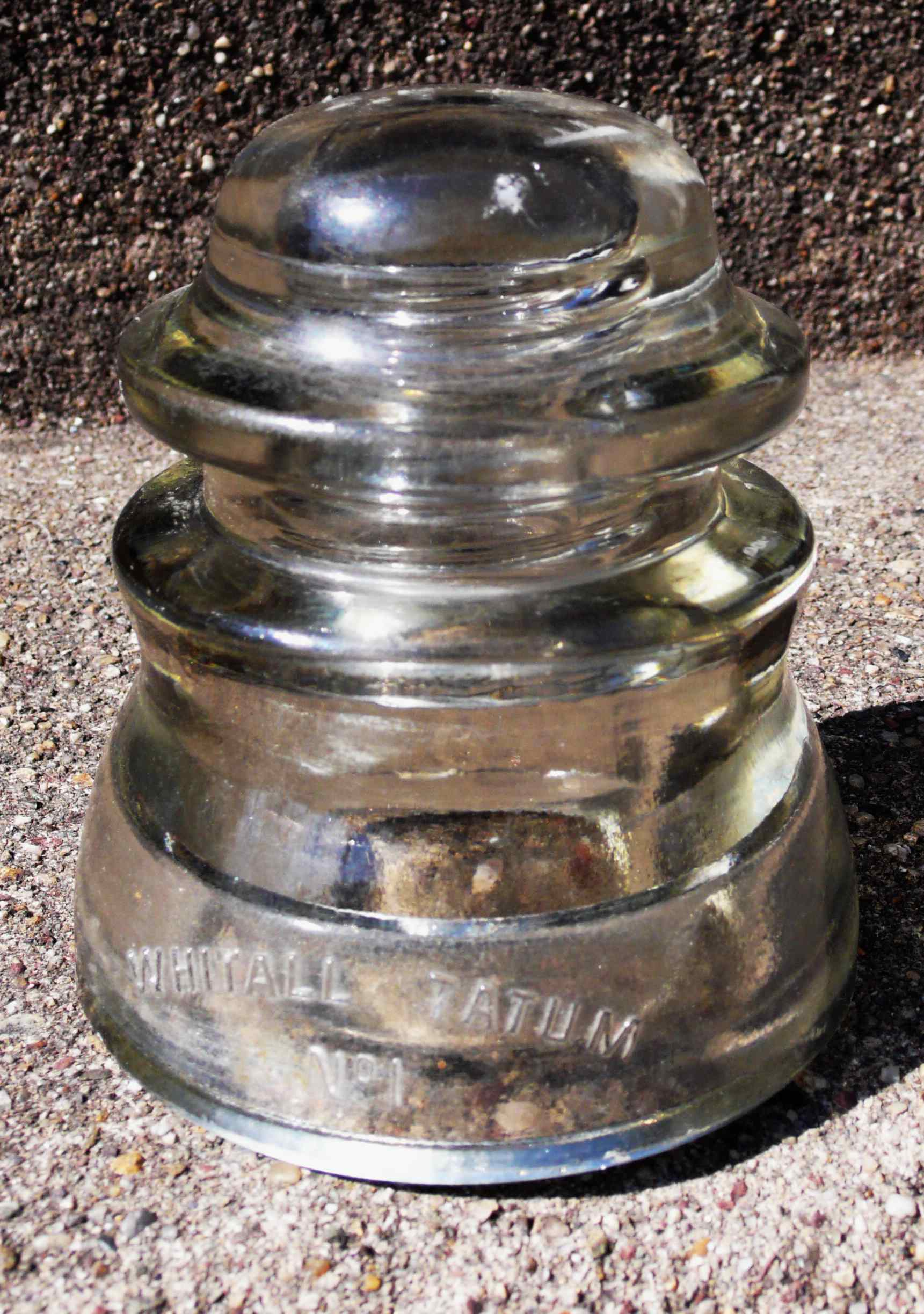
Communication line pin insulator made by Whitall Tatum, circa 1945 (after the company was purchased by Armstrong, but before name on insulator units was changed to reflect this)

Whitall Tatum entered the insulator manufacturing market in 1922, mass-producing them for use on power and communications lines across the country. Armstrong Cork Corporation purchased Whitall-Tatum in 1938, continuing insulator production under the Armstrong trademark. Production continued after a 1969 purchase by Kerr Glass Manufacturing Corporation until about 1976. One final run of Kerr DP-1s was manufactured in 1978. Some of these particular units have flat domes, and are rather scarce among insulators found "in the wild".

The former Whitall Tatum plant in Millville was purchased by a series of companies, including the American Can Company. Ball-Foster purchased the factory in 1995, and in 1999, after 193 years of nearly continuous glass production, the factory was shut down. The buildings where the WT glass furnaces sat have been demolished.
