= Pin insulator =

Device providing electrical insulation of a wire from a supporting structure

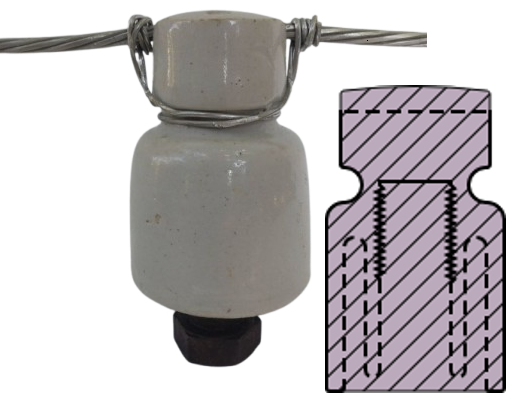
Low-voltage porcelain insulator, European style.

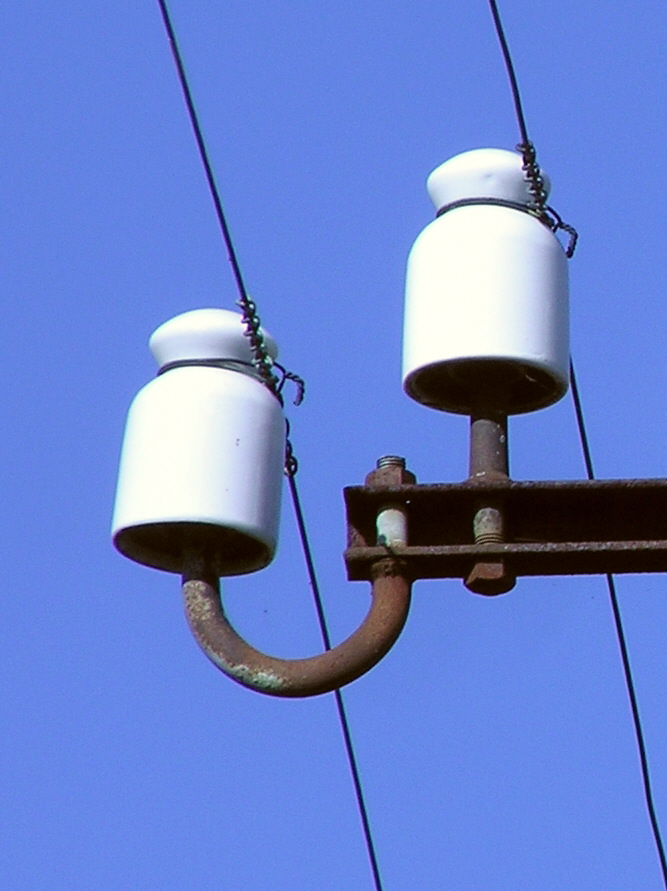
An insulator of a telephone transmission line in Europe.

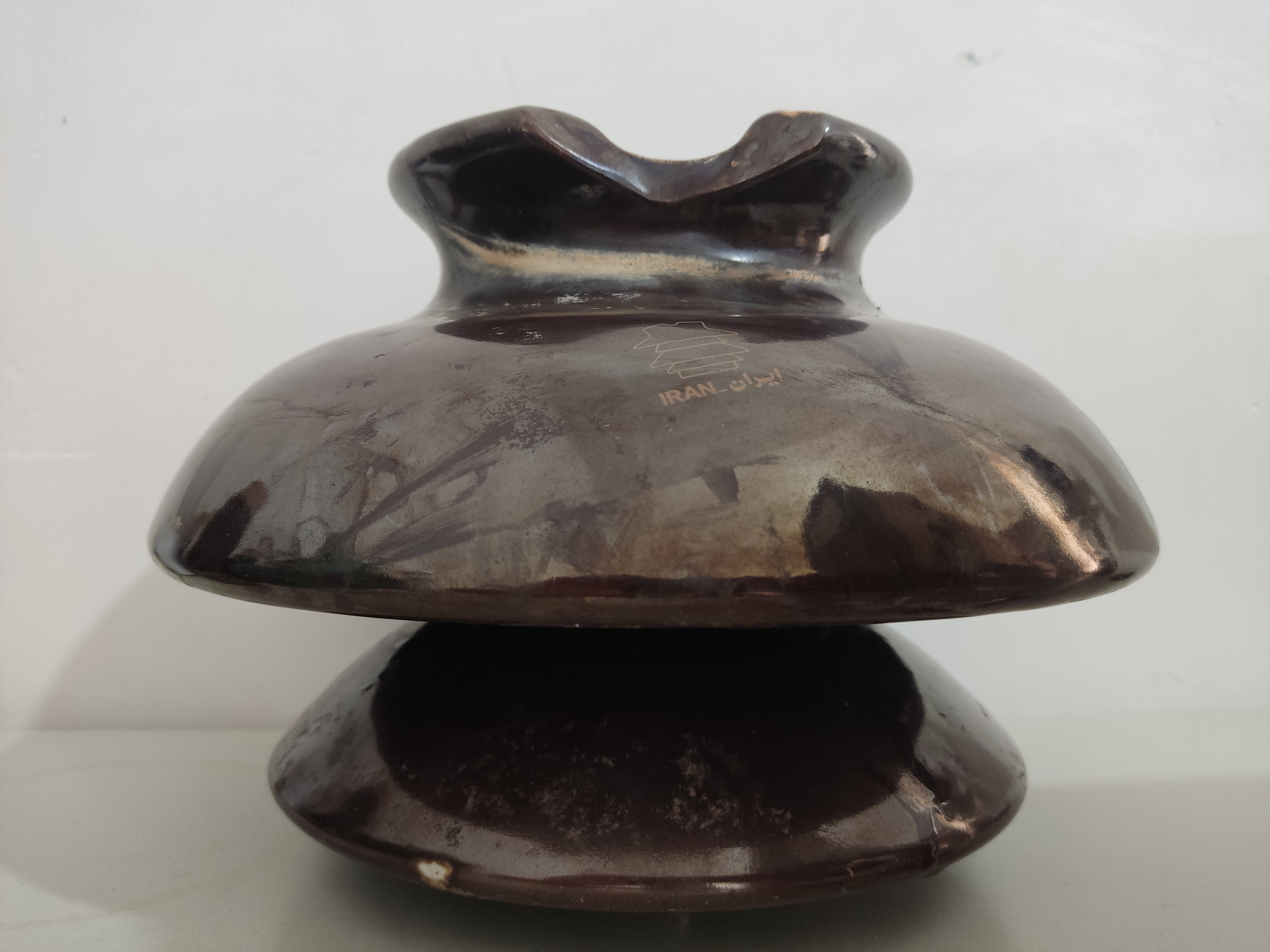
A pin insulator ceramic plate used for 20 KV lines

A pin insulator is an electrical insulator that isolates a wire from a physical support such as a pin (a wooden or metal dowel of about 3 cm diameter, typically with screw threads) on a telegraph or utility pole. It is a formed, single layer shape that is made out of a non-conducting material, usually porcelain or glass. It is still popularly used in power networks up to 33 KV. Single or multiple pin insulators can be used on one physical support, however, the number of insulators used depends upon the application's voltage.

Pin insulators are one of three types of overhead insulators, the others being strain insulators and suspension insulators. Unlike the others, pin insulators are directly connected to the physical support compared to being suspended from the wire. Pin insulators are shaped to allow the secure attachment of the conducting wire and avoid it coming adrift. The wire is usually attached to the insulator by being wrapped around it or in other circumstances, fixed into grooves on the insulator itself.

When an insulator is wet, its outer surface becomes conductive making the insulator less effective. An insulator has an umbrella-like design so that it can protect the lower part of the insulator from rain. To keep the inner side of the insulator dry, ridges around the insulator, "rain sheds", are made. These increase the creepage distance from the energized wire to the mounting pin.

== Collecting ==
Pin insulators have become collectible items. All glass pin-type insulators are assigned a Consolidated Design (CD) number, a system first implemented by hobbyist N.R. Woodward in 1954, and widely introduced starting in 1965 by collector Helmer Turner. CD numbers first appeared in print in Woodward’s “Glass insulators in America, 1967 report”. Each CD number corresponds to a specific glass style/shape. CD numbers are only hobby-specific for collectors, and are not used or recognised by insulator manufacturers. Porcelain insulators use the Unipart (U) or Multipart (M) numbering system, developed by Jack Tod.

Insulators, at the time of manufacturing, were simply viewed as an engineering product and were not meant to be an entertainment product for spectators. This meant that the quality of the insulators was not a primary concern of the manufacturers that made them. The finished product was usually discoloured from impurities and foreign objects diffused within the molten glass and metal molds. These impurities give the insulator a unique character and high value as collectors would rather obtain an imperfect product rather than a perfect, common product. Impurities in the glass can create amber swirls, milk swirls, graphite inclusions, and two or three-tone insulators. Foreign objects contained within the glass are known to be nails, pennies, and screws.

Although glass insulators are the most popular for the majority of collectors, many people collect porcelain insulators as well. These also come in a variety of shapes, sizes, and colors. They are classified in the U and M systems, primarily developed by Jack Tod and Elton Gish.

== Manufacturers ==
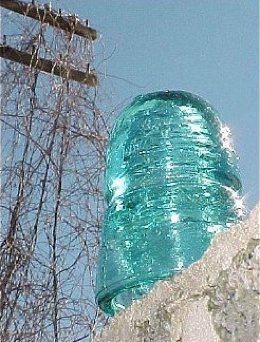
A sparkling CD 145 or "beehive" insulator from the telegraph era made by the Brookfield Glass Company circa 1882.

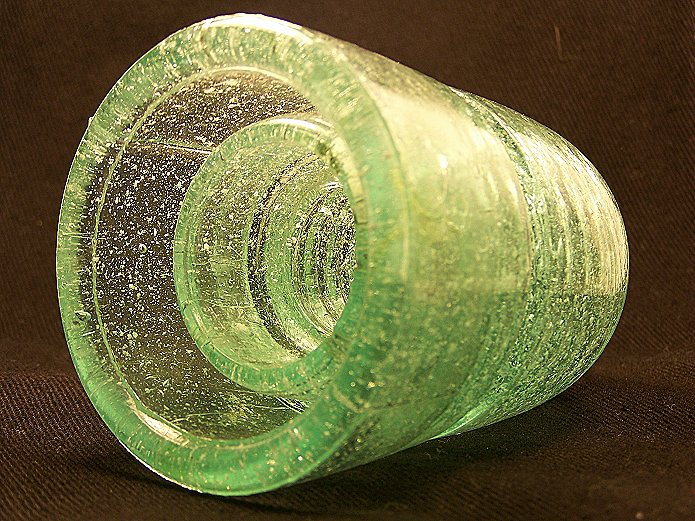
The same snowy CREB 145 sitting on its side

One of the major U.S. manufacturers that produced glass insulators during the 19th century and early 20th century in the USA was Brookfield Glass Company. It can be assumed that Brookfield may have had poor quality control as their insulators seem to be found with the most imperfections, however, this could be disputed.

Another major U.S. manufacturer that produced glass insulators was the Hemingray Glass Company. They were known for producing the most variety of colors. Some examples of colors that the company produced are yellow, golden yellow, butterscotch, glowing orange, amber, whiskey amber, "root beer" amber, orange-amber, red-amber, oxblood, green, lime green, sage green, depression green, emerald green, olive green, yellow-olive green, aqua, cornflower blue, electric blue, cobalt blue, sapphire blue, glowing peacock blue, and many others. Different colors were produced to allow two or more different utility companies to quickly identify which wires were theirs by the color of insulator if multiple wires were strung over the same utility pole. For example, one company may have a string of amber insulators, while another, on the same poles, might have their insulators in cobalt blue.

There are many manufacturers in the United States, Canada, and other countries that can be found embossed on all styles of insulators. A non-comprehensive list of these manufacturers is below:

=== United States ===
- AT&T
- American Insulator Company
- Armstrong
- Brookfield Glass Company
- Beaver Falls Glass Company
- Baltimore glass manufacturing company
- Barclay
- Birmingham
- Boston bottle works
- Buzby
- California
- California Electric Works
- Chambers
- Chester
- Chicago Insulating Company
- Cutter
- Duquesne
- Electrical Construction and Maintenance Company
- Emminger’s
- Gayner
- Greeley
- Gregory
- Good
- Hawley
- Homer Brooks
- Hamilton
- Hemingray Glass Company
- King City Glass Works (K.C.G.W.)
- Kerr
- Knowles
- Kimble
- Luther G. Tillotson & Company
- Lefferts
- Locke
- Locke Victor
- Lowex
- Lynchburg
- McLaughlin
- Maydwell
- McKee & Co.
- McMicking
- Mulford & Biddle
- New England Glass Manufacturing Company (N.E.G.M.Co.)
- National Insulator Company
- Oakman Manufacturing Company
- Ohio Valley Glass Company (O.V.G.Co.)
- Owens Illinois
- Paisley
- Postal
- Pyrex
- Sterling
- Seiler’s
- Standard Glass Insulator Company
- Star
- Thomas-Houston Electric Company
- Thames Glass Works
- Twiggs
- Victor Insulators
- Western Electric Manufacturing Company
- Western Glass Manufacturing Company
- Western Flint Glass Company
- Whitall Tatum Company

=== Canada ===
- Diamond
- Dominion
- Hamilton Glass Works
- G.N.W.TEL. Co.

=== International ===
- Agee (Australia)
- Isorex (France)
- Miva (Italy)
- Telgraficos Nacionales (Mexico)
- Zicme (South America)
