= Hemingray Glass Company =

American glass manufacturing company

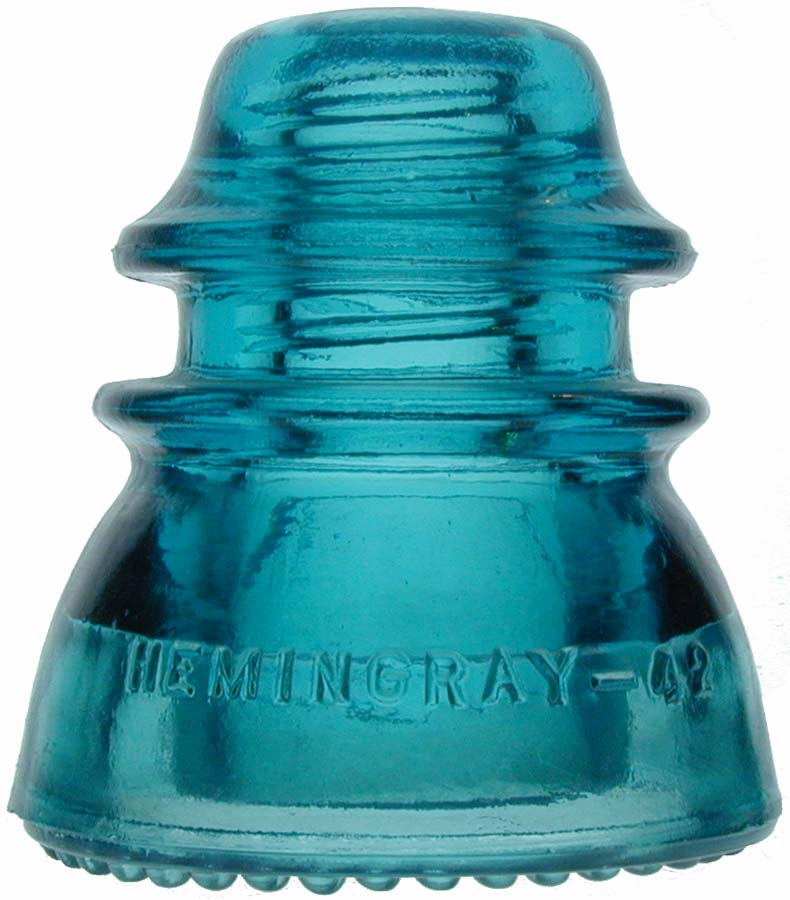
- The Hemingray 42, a telegraph pin insulator produced by the Hemingray Glass Company, is widely found in North America
- Formerly: Gray & Hemingray; Gray, Hemingray & Bros. Gray, Hemingray & Brother; Hemingray Bros. & Company; R. Hemingray & Company
- Industry: Glass
- Founded: 1848 in Cincinnati, Ohio, US
- Founders: Robert Hemingray; Ralph Gray
- Defunct: 1972
- Fate: Purchased by the Owens-Illinois Glass Company
- Headquarters: Muncie, Indiana
- Number of locations: 3
- Area served: North America
- Products: Pin insulators

The Hemingray Glass Company was an American glass manufacturing company founded by Robert Hemingray and Ralph Gray in Cincinnati in 1848. In its early years, the company went through numerous and frequent name changes, including Gray & Hemingray; Gray, Hemingray & Bros.; Gray, Hemingray & Brother; Hemingray Bros. & Company; and R. Hemingray & Company before incorporating into the Hemingray Glass Company, Inc. in 1870. The Hemingray Glass Company had factories in Cincinnati and Covington, Kentucky with main production in Muncie, Indiana. Although Hemingray was best known for its telegraph insulators, the company produced many other glass items including bottles, fruit jars, pressed glass dishes, tumblers, battery jars, fishbowls, lantern globes, and oil lamps. In 1933, the Owens-Illinois Glass Company purchased the company, but the Hemingray name was retained at the production facility in Muncie.

The main plant in Muncie closed in 1972, and the company ceased producing insulators. The complex is now used by Gerdau Ameristeel, a steel production company headquartered in Brazil.

== Insulators ==
Hemingray was best known for producing telegraph and telephone pin insulators used on utility poles. To give an overview of the large variety of styles produced, the following table contains the twenty most common. The table provides two numbers: the Consolidated Design (CD) number and the style number. The CD number is from a classification system developed by collectors that refers to the shape of the insulator, and is independent of the Hemingray Glass Company. However, the style number (or name) was assigned by Hemingray to each insulator. Due to slight modifications in design over years of production, single styles can span multiple CD numbers.

CD	Style	Introduced	Discontinued	Usage	Nickname
106	9	1890s	1940s	Telephone, rural	Pony
107	9	1950s	1960s	Telephone, rural	Pony
113	12	1890s	1940s	Telephone	Double Groove Pony
121	16	1890s	1920s	Long distance	Toll
122	16	1919	1960s	Telephone, long distance	Toll
124	4	1880s	1910s	Telephone	
125	15	1870s	1933	Telegraph	
128	CSA	1930s	1950s	Telephone, long distance	
129	TS	1940s	1960s	Transposition	
133	Standard	1870s	1910s	Telegraph	Signal
134	18	1880s	1930s	Telegraph, secondary power distribution	
145	21	1880s	1930s	Telegraph	Beehive
147		1907	1920s	Telegraph	Spiral Groove
152	40	1910	1921	Telegraph	Hoopskirt
154	42	1921	1960s	Telegraph	
155	45	1938	1960s	Telephone, long distance	
160	14	1880s	1956	Telephone, rural	Baby Signal
162	19	1880s	1940s	Secondary power distribution, telephone	Signal
163	19	1940s	1960s	Secondary power distribution	
164	20	1880s	1940	Secondary power distribution	

== See also ==
- Brookfield Glass Company
