= General Toll Switching Plan =

Long-distance telephone system in North America of 1929

The General Toll Switching Plan was a systematic nationwide effort by the American Telephone and Telegraph Company (AT&T) of organizing the telephone toll circuits and cable routes of the nation, and of streamlining the operating principles and technical infrastructure for connecting long-distance telephone calls in North America. This involved the design of a hierarchical system of toll-switching centers, a process that had found substantial maturity by 1929. The system was manually controlled by long-distance telephone operators.

The switching plan was principally operated by the Long Lines division of the Bell System in cooperation with independent telephone companies under the decree of the Kingsbury Commitment, reached with the United States government in 1913.

It was the forerunner of an automated system called Nationwide Operator Toll Dialing that was begun in 1943, which eventually led to Direct Distance Dialing (DDD) within the framework of the North American Numbering Plan decades later.

== Long-distance telephone service ==
In the same manner that early telephone users developed an increasing desire to talk to each other, and expected the service to reach farther out and increase the number of participating private and business customers locally, so did users in different towns and cities desire to call each other. However, the state of the technology initially had limitation in distance. Telephone companies developed on a local basis, usually one company for each community. As the technology of telephones and of line construction improved, logistical problems stood in the way of rapid expansion. Solutions had to be found for organizational structure, management, business relationships, collaboration, to operate telephone services between or across multiple communities.

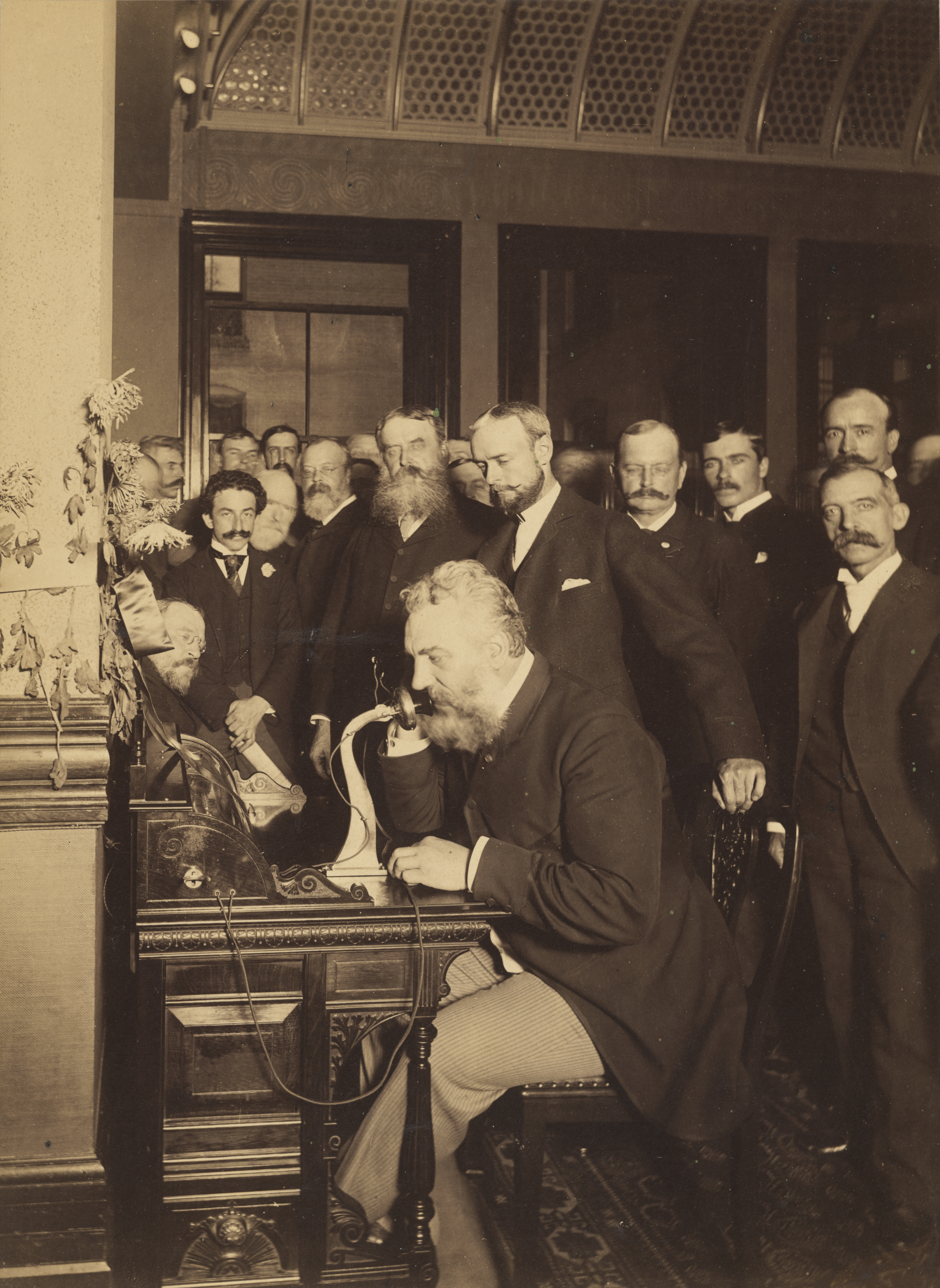
Alexander Graham Bell ceremonially inaugurated the first New York–Chicago toll route in 1892.

Theodore Newton Vail, General Manager of the American Bell Telephone Company, created the vision for this endeavor. The first long-distance experiment was the Boston–New York telephone line. Vail suggested that a company separate from the four or five affected local telephone companies should be responsible for the construction and operation of the line. Approved in 1880, he directed American Bell Telephone to incorporate a new entity in New York, the Inter-State Telephone Company for the construction of the first section starting in Boston, with the grant of a license by American Bell. An additional company was formed in Connecticut to complete the line to New York. The Boston–New York toll line opened in 1884,

Building additional long-distance lines would require enormous amounts of financing. However, the Massachusetts legislature rejected an application to increase the corporate capitalization of American Bell. With the experience of incorporating Inter-State Telephone in New York, the company formed a new subsidiary in New York City, the American Telephone and Telegraph Company, on March 3, 1885, with Theodore Vail as its first president. The new company had the mandate to construct and operate long-distance telephone lines, and would negotiate and facilitate inter-connections to local telephones companies under the umbrella of the Bell System. This original purpose of the business would later be delegated to a division called Long Lines. By 1892, the company's long-distance network reached Chicago, but the New York–Chicago line did not become commercially successful until after 1900, and the invention of the loading coil.

== Universal service ==
Bell System advertisement of 1915 promoting universal, nationwide service

In 1907, Theodore Vail became president of the American Telephone and Telegraph Company for the second time, having left the company previously in 1887. Immediately, he steered the company into a new direction. He refined a vision of service, shaped new goals for supporting technological progress, and reorganized the company to facilitate his ideas. He envisioned universal telephone service as a public utility, and the future of the American telephone industry as a unified system of companies under the lead of American Telephone and Telegraph.

Such a nationwide network required technical standards that were understood and accepted by all cooperating participants in the industry. The Western Electric Company, the Bell System's sole and dedicated manufacturing unit, which was previously not permitted by company policy to sell outside the Bell System, was now directed to advertise and sell its products to the general market, so that independent operators could buy compatible apparatus. Vail organized a distinct research division within Western Electric, the later Bell Laboratories, to focus on basic research and development to solve the problems encountered in improving the technology of telephony. These efforts and this vision were communicated to the public by marketing campaigns under the slogan

One System — One Policy — Universal Service

== Kingsbury Commitment ==
In 1913, AT&T settled pending anti-trust challenges in the Kingsbury Commitment. On December 19, 1913, in a letter by Nathan C. Kingsbury to the U.S. Attorney General, AT&T conceded to restrictions in the acquisition of independent companies, and agreed to the divestiture of Western Union. AT&T's telephone operations thereby essentially became a government-sanctioned natural monopoly, because an essential feature of this commitment was that independent telephony operators were permitted to "secure for their subscribers toll service over the lines of the companies in the Bell System." removing the barriers to a nationwide telephone system that would have no competitors.

== Local toll networks ==
While the Bell System had a specialized division, Long Lines, to interconnect the local telephone networks of its Associated Companies, no such unifying driving force existed in the independent telephone industry. Telephone companies negotiated interconnection with neighboring businesses and built localized toll networks that addressed the regional needs of their customers. The interconnection agreements with the Bell System provided access beyond these networks.

== Long-haul and transcontinental transmission ==
Long-distance toll lines for transmission of telephone calls were almost entirely open-wire pair installations early in the 20th century. By 1911, the Long Lines network had reached from New York as far west as Denver, using loading coil circuits, but this distance was the limit for communication without amplification. The research efforts at Western Electric, committed to by Vail in c. 1909, into the principles of the electron tube recently invented by Lee de Forest, the Audion, and its efficient manufacture made it possible to build signal repeaters that extended the transmission distance of toll lines. In 1914, AT&T succeeded in the first transcontinental transmission line spanning between the Atlantic Ocean and the Pacific Ocean. This connected a large customer base in the far west beyond the Rocky Mountains to the AT&T Long Lines network.

Open wire, while marginally increasing in installations in the 1920s, was increasingly supplemented with cable routes, experiencing dramatic growth, but also with carrier telephony, a new development which multiplexed multiple communication channels, at times 200 or 300 circuits, on the same physical cable medium.

By 1925, the extent and quality of transmission lines in the nation was good enough, so that telephone subscribers could place telephone calls to almost anywhere in the continental United States. However, set-up times for calls were typically still long, and callers often had to hang up after ordering a call with an operator, who called them back when the circuit was established. In 1925, the average time to establish connections was still over seven minutes, but this improved to about two and one half minutes by 1929.

The extensions of the nationwide interconnections led to rapid increase in traffic. In 1915, less than a quarter billion toll messages had been carried in the Bell System. Over the next fifteen years, this more than quadrupled to over one billion. An increasing fraction of this traffic was for the long-haul routes in the network, between the largest cities in the nation and via the transcontinental routes. As a consequence, the build-out of long-haul plant was emphasized in investments, resulting in better quality circuits for long-haul transmissions.

Due to the investments in the plant, the average time for establishing connections was steadily decreasing throughout the 1920s, AT&T was able to effect several rate cuts in long-distance service in just a few years. However, the growth also caused major construction problems in the layout of the cable plant. By 1930, the long-haul business was handled by about 2,500 toll centers, out of 6,400 central offices in the United States and eastern Canada.

The long-haul build-out in the United States was paralleled by the construction of the Trans-Canada Telephone System, having been planned immediately after the formation of the Telephone Association of Canada in 1921.

A systematic approach was needed to limit the number of intermediate toll offices that relayed the calls across the country, to further reduce set-up time, and to establish technical parameters for interchange points to assure a certain level of circuit quality. In 1929, the results of this research outlined a new fundamental layout of the toll plant (circuit) and the routing of toll calls. This first continental toll switching system became known as the General Toll Switching Plan.

== Hierarchical interconnections ==
During the growth of telephone service since the first installations of telephone exchanges and the development of advanced manual and automatic switching systems, approximately 2,500 switching systems had been established in the nation that had trunks for connecting to other communities. The systems were designated as toll centers to which all local calls were routed that had to be connected to another toll center closer to the destination of each long distance call.

The technological improvements since the transcontinental transmission line of 1914 required a new methodology and plan of managing the traffic. The purpose of this plan was to provide systematically a basic layout of the plant compatible with the highest practicable standards of service achievable within given economic goals. The layout of cabling and major toll centers needed optimization in the number of switching steps required along a given route to connect any two telephones on the continent.

The General Toll Switching Plan organized these local toll centers into geographical groups associated with region within which all toll centers forwarded calls to destinations outside their territory to a Primary Outlet. The Primary Outlet was responsible for establishing an optimal route either to another Primary Outlet or to a Regional Center. Regional Centers were toll-switches responsible for a yet larger geographic region each. The Regional Centers were strategically located across the nation and each maintained cable routes to all other Regional Centers. In addition, they connected to some Primary Outlets in other regions as well, as traffic demanded, or for alternate routing in case of congestion or technical failures.

== See also ==
- Original North American area codes
- Routing in the PSTN
- Transmission line
