= Western Flint Glass Company =

The Western Flint Glass Company was a glass house based near Denver, Colorado which was founded in 1899, and was in operation until late 1900, when its ownership and product line was changed and it became the Western Glass Manufacturing Company.

== History ==
After a furnace in one of the buildings of the Valverde Glass Company ruptured on June 27, 1899, causing massive damage to one of the buildings and bankrupting the old company, new investors rented the old plant and began reconstructing it. Operations began that fall, with Frank Riley Ashley, secretary of the Western Chemical Company at the time, as president.

== Products ==
Even though the company was only in operation for a single year, they managed to produce a fairly large volume of products.

=== Glass insulators ===
The most well known products of the Western Flint Glass Company are their telegraph insulators. They are known to have manufactured consolidated design (CD) numbers 106, 121, 134, and 162. Evidence also strongly suggests that CD numbers 145, 190/191, 288, and 298 were produced, although none have been found to date marked with the company name. It has been shown, by close inspection of insulators, that all marked molds used by W.F.G. Co. had been previously used by the Valverde Glass Company.

=== Quality issues ===
Because the company was founded and operated by investors who were inexperienced in glass manufacturing, the glass produced was of fairly low quality, as they struggled to get uniform color and glass properties from batch to batch. For this reason W.F.G. Co. was never very successful in the bottle market, where glass of uniform color and appearance was important. The glass produced was, however, acceptable for manufacture of glass telegraph insulators. In the summer of 1900, the company hired Michael Nester, an expert in glass production, in order to help train workers and produce de-colorized glass. Shortly thereafter the company was re-organized under his control and renamed Western Glass Manufacturing Company.
