= Open wire =

Early telecommunication transmission technology

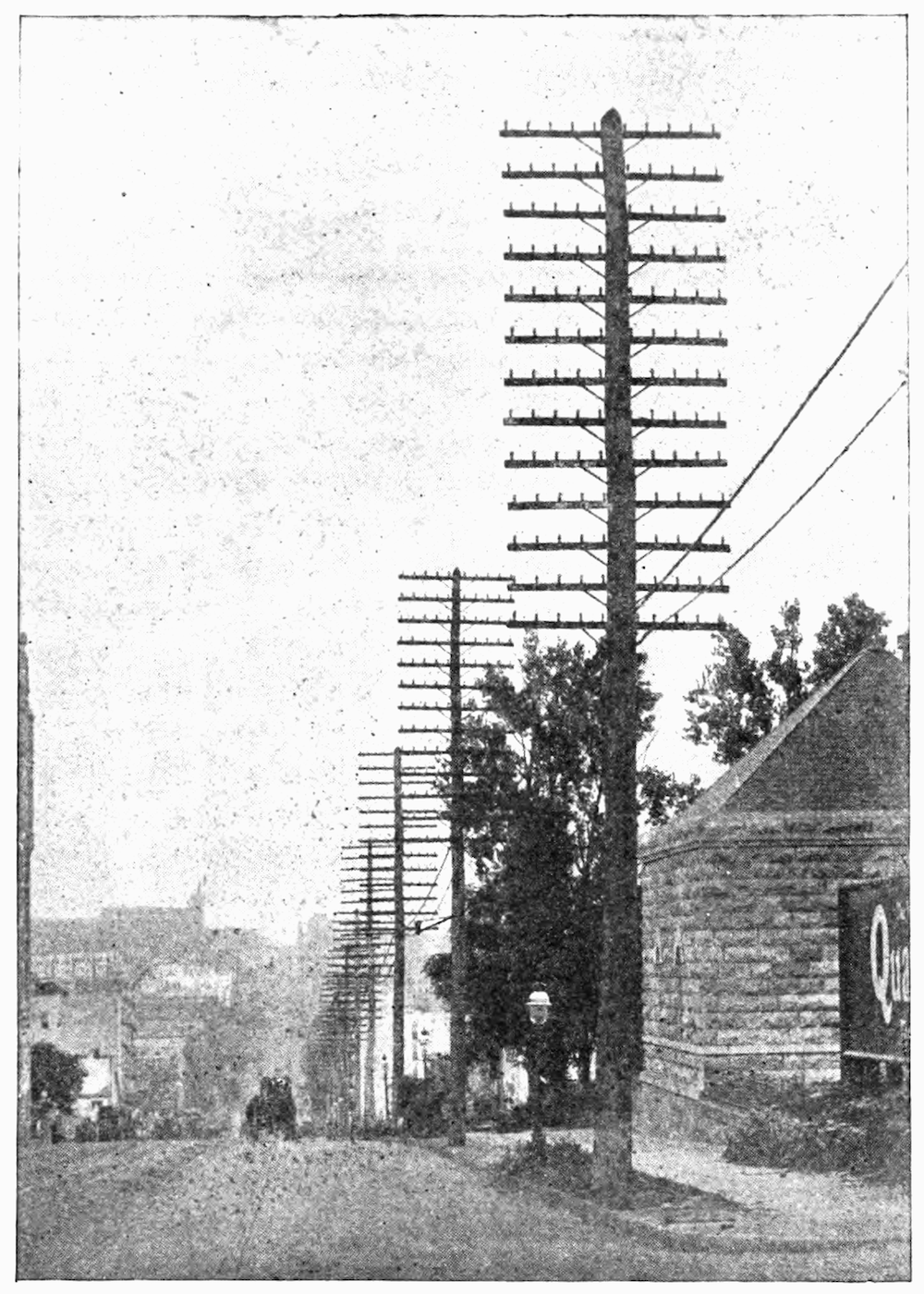
Long-distance open-wire pole line along Amsterdam Avenue in New York City. (Abbott, 1903)

Open wire was an early transmission technology in telecommunication, first used in telegraphy. It consisted of pairs of electric wire strung on a pole line between communities, towns, and cities.

AT&T pin-type glass insulator for long-distance transmission line

The wire of the transmission line was attached to the cross-arms of each pole with glass insulators. It was originally manufactured from iron or steel, but developments in annealing of copper made it possible to use this metal by the 1890s to reduce electrical resistance substantially. Copper wire was drawn to a diameter of up to 1/6 inch (165 mils).

The glass insulators on the pole cross-arms were spaced at about 12 inches (30cm) apart. Typically up to five wire pairs were installed on each crossarm, and multiple cross-arms could be installed on each pole.

The practical limit in distance of telephone communication via open-wire transmission was reached when the Bell System long-distance network was extended from New York City to Denver in 1911. Despite heavy-gauge wire, and using loading coils to reduce transmission loss, talking was just barely possible over the line until the first Audion amplifiers were added.

Open wire systems along power lines use differential transformers for common-mode signal suppression at both ends. In many countries like Germany, open wire systems are not used any more for the public telephone grid. However, such installations are still operated along non-electrified railway lines, for internal communication of the railway operator.

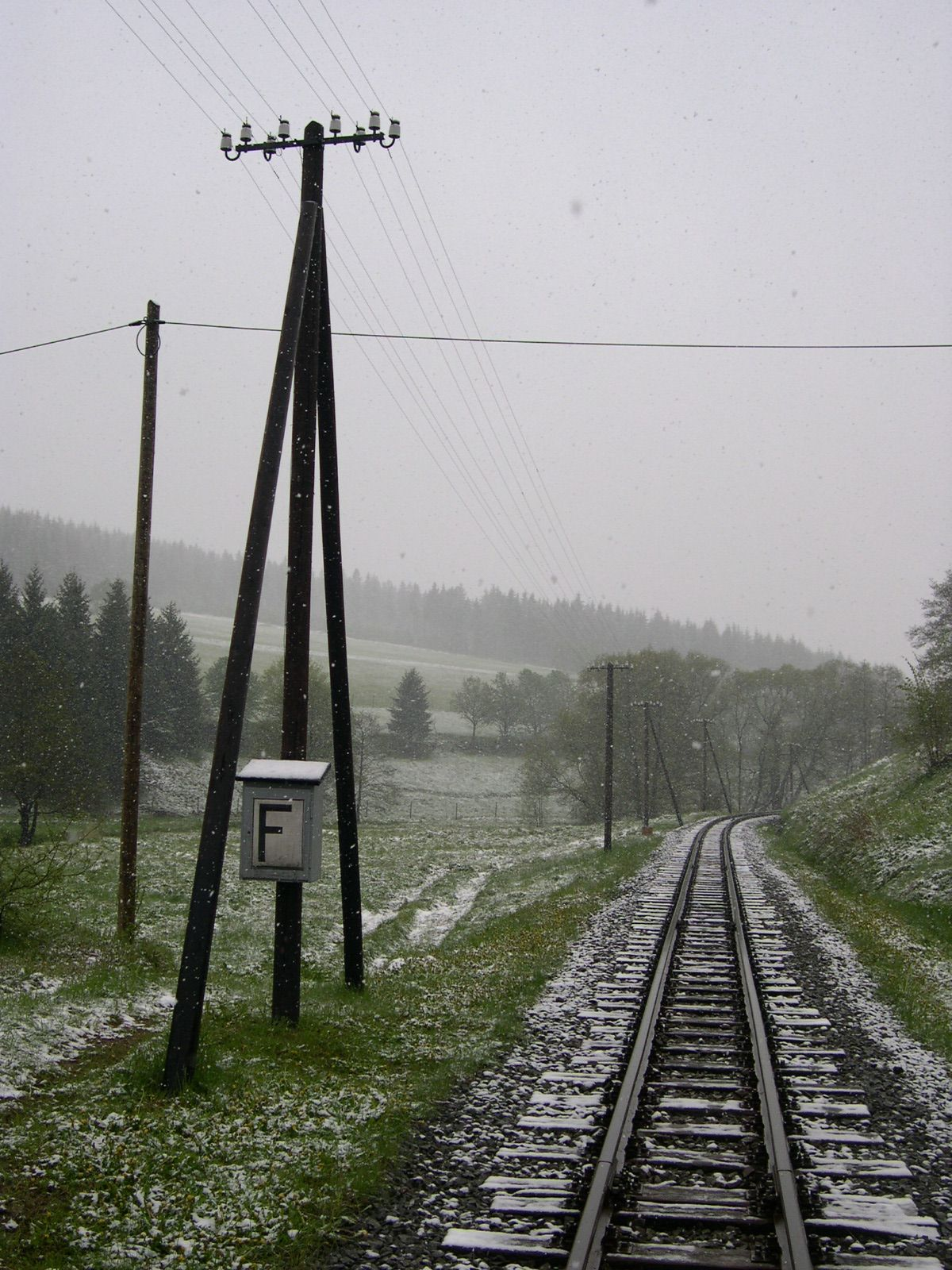
An open wire system along a railway line in Germany

== See also ==
- General Toll Switching Plan
- Overhead power line
- Twisted pair § History
