= Brookfield Glass Company =

- Brookfield Glass pin-type insulator (type CD-121) made for the American Telephone and Telegraph Company (AT&T) for toll transmission lines (c.1890–1910s)
- Formerly: Bushwick Glass Works
- Industry: Glass
- Founded: 1864
- Founders: James Madison Brookfield; Martin Kalbfleisch
- Defunct: 1921
- Fate: Defunct
- Headquarters: Brooklyn, New York
- Number of locations: Brooklyn, New York (1864–1912); Old Bridge, New Jersey (1906–1921)
- Area served: United States
- Products: Telegraph insulators, jars

Brookfield Glass Company was an American glass company based in Brooklyn, New York, from 1864 to c. 1912, and in Old Bridge, New Jersey, from c. 1906 to 1921. It was known for producing industrial glassware such as jars, bottles, and electrical insulators. The company's business began as the Bushwick Glass Works in Brooklyn in c. 1860, and operated as the Brookfield Glass Company from 1898 until dissolution of the company in 1922.

== History ==
James Madison Brookfield, born October 2, 1813, in Cape May, New Jersey, had been a glass maker at several businesses, before he himself started a glass company in Honesdale, Pennsylvania, in 1853. Being innovative and the first to use hard coal (anthracite) in glass making, the business thrived until it, including Bookfield's home, was destroyed and swept away in a dam break of the local water system. He moved to Brooklyn, New York, and founded the Bushwick Glass Works in Greenpoint.

=== Bottles and jars ===
Martin Kalbfleisch, business man, administrator, and politician, who needed a reliable source of quality glass bottles, purchased the company in 1864, and left the operation to Brookfield. In 1869, Brookfield repurchased the company, which produced primarily food storage jars.

=== Insulators ===
James Brookfield was joined in the glass company by his son William, who became responsible for a growing application, insulated attachments (insulators) for open wire of telegraph transmission lines. These insulators prevented short-circuiting the wires to ground and to each other.

The Brookfields acquired the rights to a patent by Louis A. Cauvet for affixing the inverted cup-shaped insulators securely on mounting pins by means of screw-like thread structure. in 1870, James Brookfield was awarded a patent for improving the manufacture of screw-on insulators. With the growth in American telegraph communications, the threaded Brookfield glass insulator type became the standard for telegraphy lines in the country.

=== Brookfield Glass ===
During the 1870s, the Brookfields began producing large amounts of insulators at a plant in Brooklyn, New York. The volume produced was second only to the Hemingray Glass Company. It is estimated that over 100 types of insulators were produced by the Brookfields.

James Brookfield helped his son William establish the Brookfield Glass Company, incorporated in 1898, out of the Bushwick business, which William operated until his own death in 1903. His son Henry M. Brookfield had been named Vice President with the incorporation and became president with his father's death. He was granted various patents for insulator pressing machinery. When Henry became president, his brother Frank was named Vice President.

In 1906, the company opened a second plant in Old Bridge, New Jersey. The Brooklyn plant was closed in 1912.

World War I brought severe shortages of coal, which required reducing production substantially. In 1921, production had stopped at the Old Bridge plant, due to blown-out furnaces. In 1922, the company ceased business and was dissolved.
