= Strain insulator =

Electrical insulator

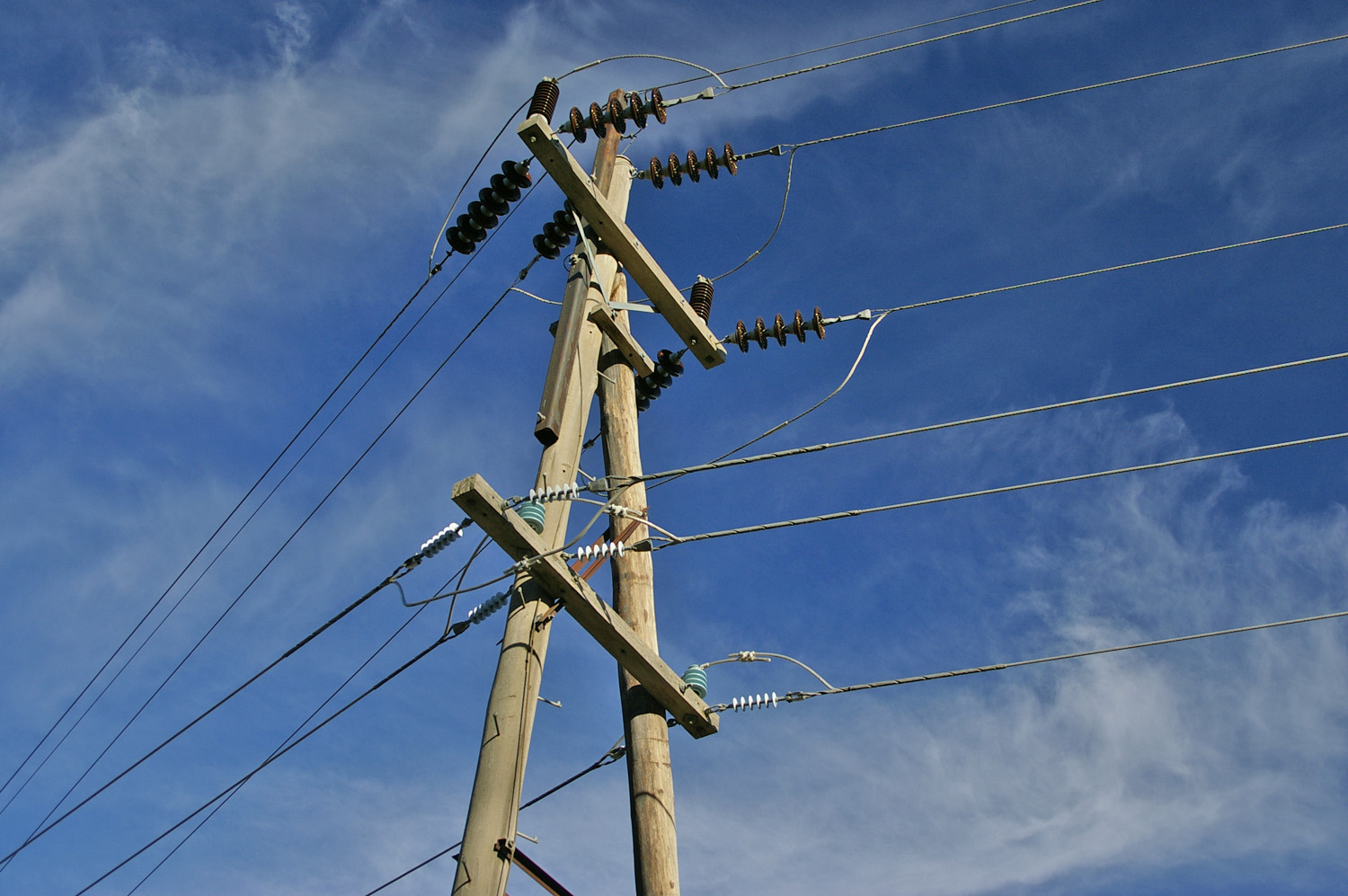
Strain insulators on high-voltage power lines

A strain insulator is an electrical insulator that is designed to work in mechanical tension (strain), to withstand the pull of a suspended electrical wire or cable. They are used in overhead electrical wiring, to support radio antennas and overhead power lines. A strain insulator may be inserted between two lengths of wire to isolate them electrically from each other while maintaining a mechanical connection, or where a wire attaches to a pole or tower, to transmit the pull of the wire to the support while insulating it electrically. Strain insulators were first used in telegraph systems in the mid 19th century.

== Description and use ==
A typical strain insulator is a piece of glass, porcelain, or fiberglass that is shaped to accommodate two cables or a cable shoe and the supporting hardware on the support structure (hook eye, or eyelet on a steel pole/tower). The shape of the insulator maximizes the distance between the cables while also maximizing the load-bearing transfer capacity of the insulator. In practice, for radio antennas, guy-wires, overhead power lines and most other loads, the strain insulator is usually in physical tension.

When the line voltage requires more insulation than a single insulator can supply, strain insulators are used in series: A set of insulators are connected to each other using special hardware. The series can support the same strain as a single insulator, but the series provides a much higher effective insulation.

If one string is insufficient for the strain, a heavy steel plate effectively bundles several insulator strings mechanically. One plate is on the "hot" end and another is located at the support structure. This setup is almost universally used on long spans, such as when a power line crosses a river, canyon, lake, or other terrain requiring a longer than nominal span.

Strain insulators are typically used outdoors in overhead wiring. In this environment they are exposed to rain and, in urban settings, pollution. As a practical matter, the shape of the insulator becomes critically important, since a wetted path from one cable to the other can create a low-resistance electrical path.

Strain insulators intended for horizontal mounting (often referred to as "dead ends") therefore incorporate flanges to shed water, and strain insulators intended for vertical mounting (referred to as "suspension insulators") are often bell-shaped.

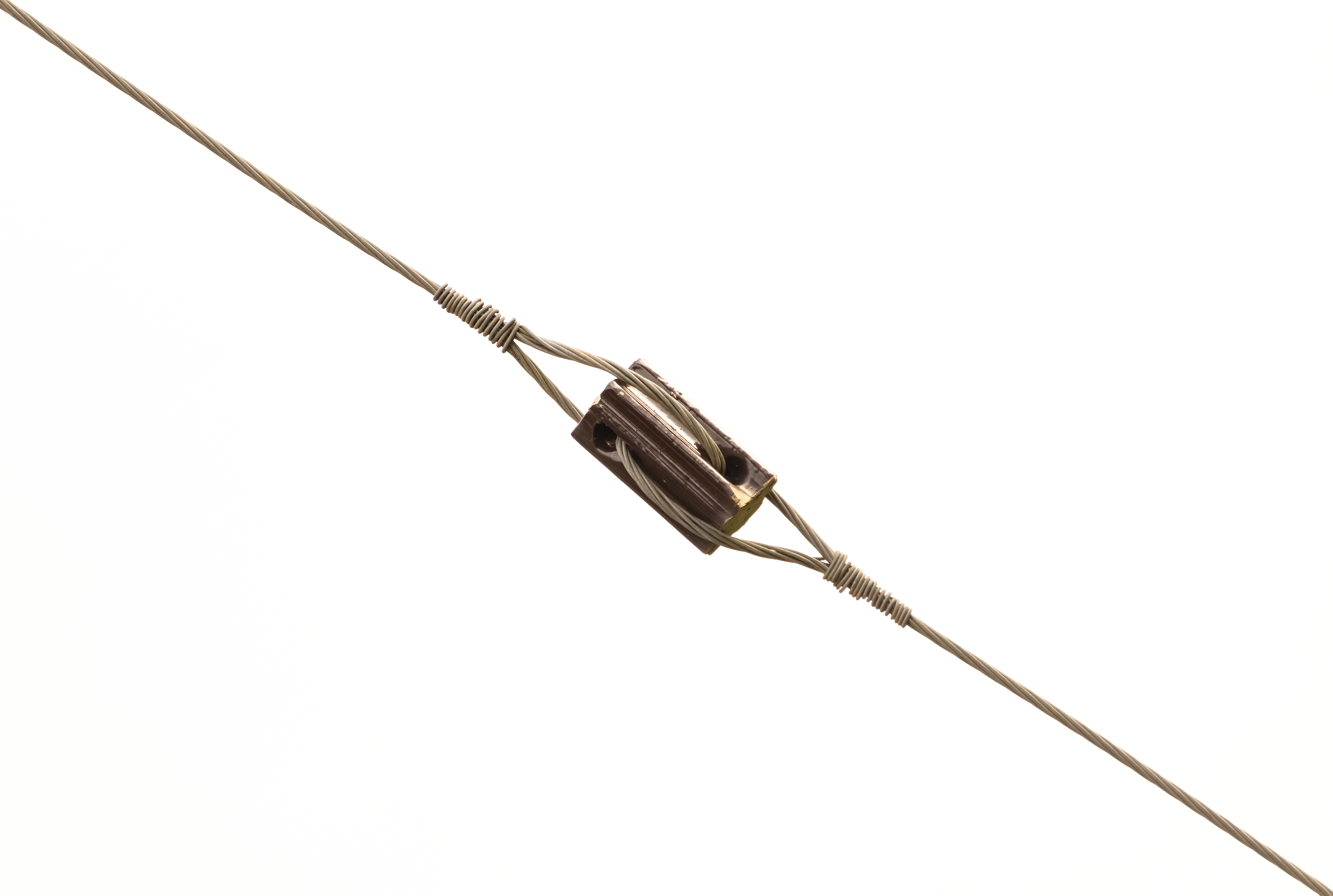
Low-voltage "egg"-type strain insulator, used in utility-pole guy cables to prevent any voltage on the guy caused by an electrical fault on the pole from reaching the lower sections accessible to the public

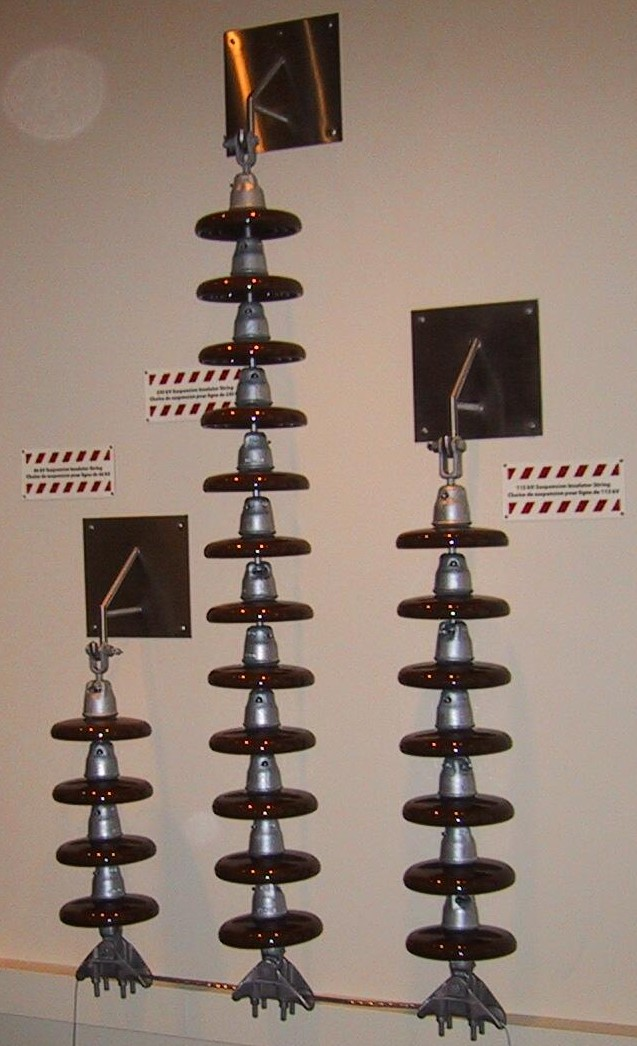
High-voltage strain insulators used on 66 kV, 230 kV and 115 kV AC lines. The number of insulator skirts varies with voltage and atmospheric conditions.

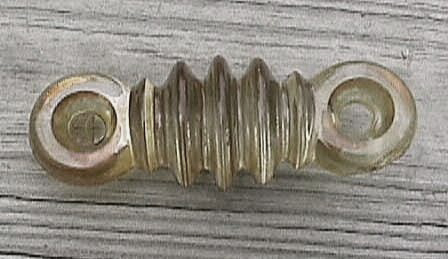
Pyrex-glass strain insulator used for radio antennas

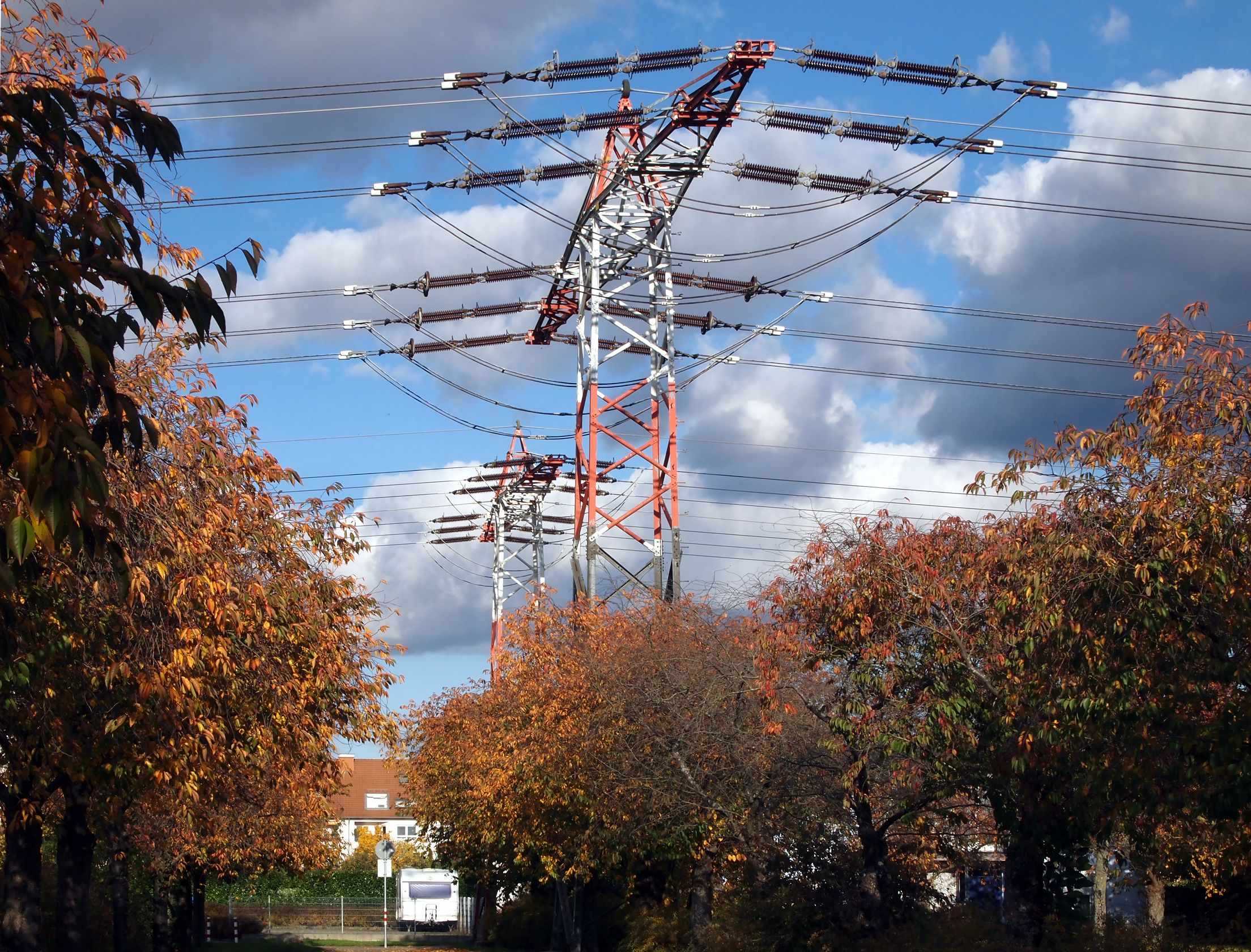
Horizontal lines and strain insulators used in pairs on each wire

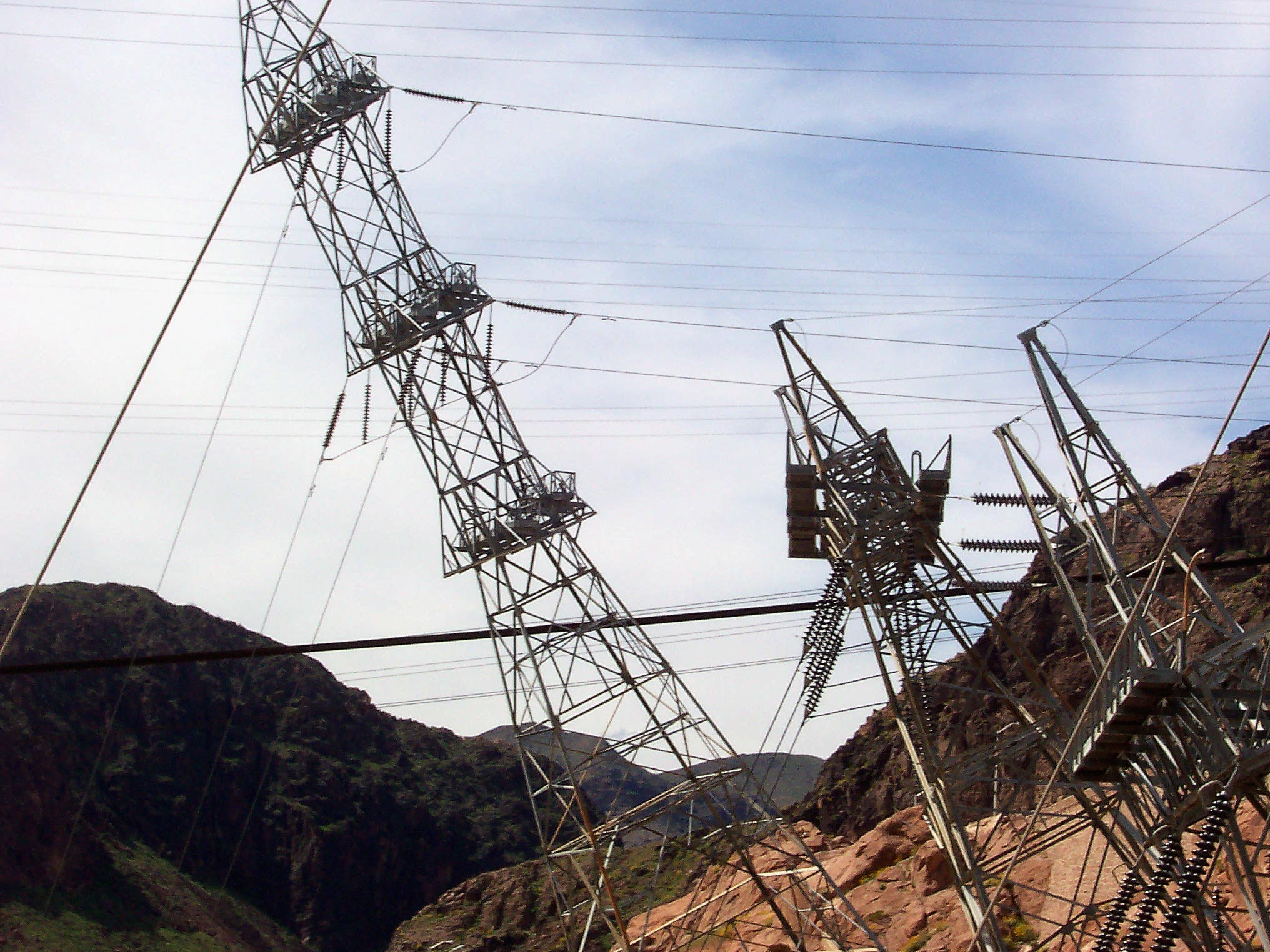
Inclined lines at Hoover Dam

== Collectors ==
Other than their industrial use for which they are produced, strain insulators can be collectables, especially antique ones.
