= Insulator (electricity) =

Material that does not conduct an electric current

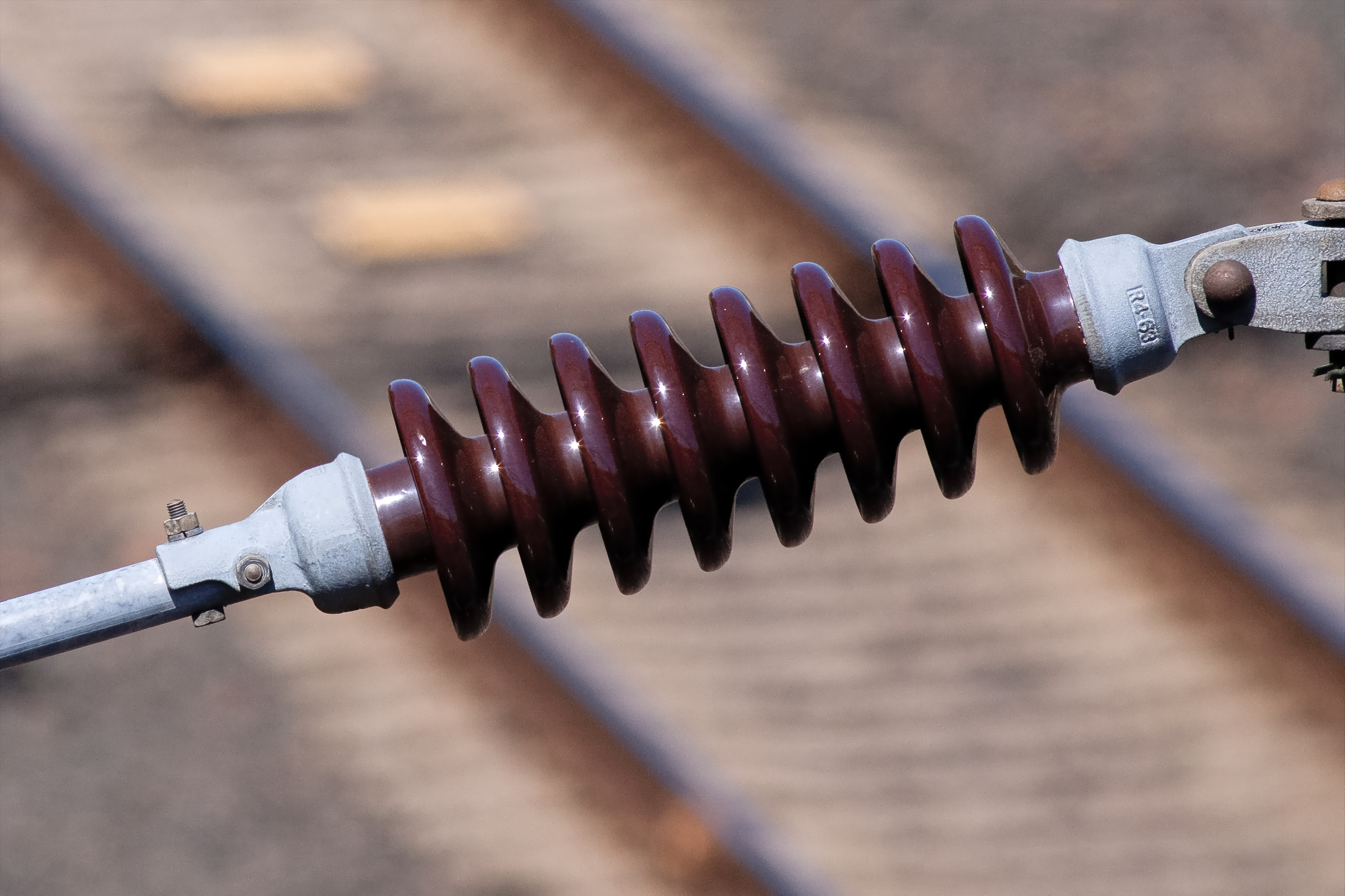
Ceramic insulator used on electrified railways. The ridged shape increases the surface distance along which electrical leakage could occur, thereby enhancing the insulator’s effectiveness, especially in wet or polluted conditions.

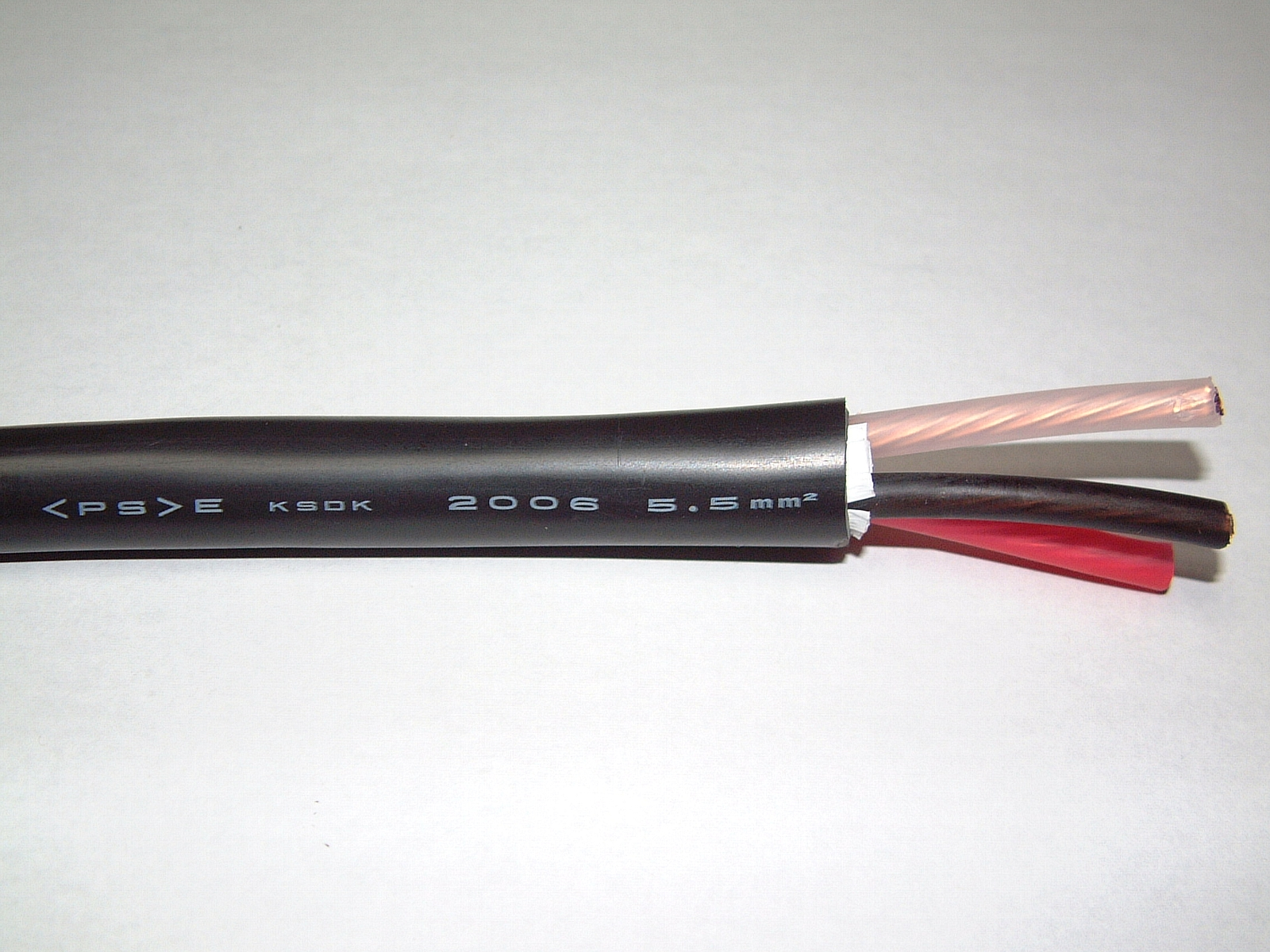
Three-core copper wire power cable, each core with an individual colour-coded insulating sheath, all contained within an outer protective sheath

An electrical insulator is a material in which electric current does not flow freely. The atoms of the insulator have tightly bound electrons which cannot readily move. Other materials—semiconductors and conductors—conduct electric current more easily. The property that distinguishes an insulator is its resistivity; insulators have higher resistivity than semiconductors or conductors. The most common examples are non-metals.

A perfect insulator does not exist because even the materials used as insulators contain small numbers of mobile charges (charge carriers) which can carry current. In addition, all insulators become electrically conductive when a sufficiently large voltage is applied that the electric field tears electrons away from the atoms. This is known as electrical breakdown, and the voltage at which it occurs is called the breakdown voltage of an insulator. Some materials such as glass, paper and PTFE, which have high resistivity, are very good electrical insulators. A much larger class of materials, even though they may have lower bulk resistivity, are still good enough to prevent significant current from flowing at normally used voltages, and thus are employed as insulation for electrical wiring and cables. Examples include rubber-like polymers and most plastics which can be thermoset or thermoplastic in nature.

Insulators are used in electrical equipment to support and separate electrical conductors without allowing current through themselves. An insulating material used in bulk to wrap electrical cables or other equipment is called insulation. The term insulator is also used more specifically to refer to insulating supports used to attach electric power distribution or transmission lines to utility poles and transmission towers. They support the weight of the suspended wires without allowing the current to flow through the tower to ground.

== Physics of conduction in solids ==
Electrical insulation is the absence of electrical conduction. Electronic band theory (a branch of physics) explains that electric charge flows when quantum states of matter are available into which electrons can be excited. This allows electrons to gain energy and thereby move through a conductor, such as a metal, if an electric potential difference is applied to the material. If no such states are available, the material is an insulator.

Most insulators have a large band gap. This occurs because the "valence" band containing the highest energy electrons is full, and a large energy gap separates this band from the next band above it. There is always some voltage (called the breakdown voltage) that gives electrons enough energy to be excited into this band. Once this voltage is exceeded, electrical breakdown occurs, and the material ceases being an insulator, passing charge. This is usually accompanied by physical or chemical changes that permanently degrade the material and its insulating properties.

When the electric field applied across an insulating substance exceeds in any location the threshold breakdown field for that substance, the insulator suddenly becomes a conductor, causing a large increase in current, an electric arc through the substance. Electrical breakdown occurs when the electric field in the material is strong enough to accelerate free charge carriers (electrons and ions, which are always present at low concentrations) to a high enough velocity to knock electrons from atoms when they strike them, ionizing the atoms. These freed electrons and ions are in turn accelerated and strike other atoms, creating more charge carriers, in a chain reaction. Rapidly the insulator becomes filled with mobile charge carriers, and its resistance drops to a low level. In a solid, the breakdown voltage is proportional to the band gap energy. When corona discharge occurs, the air in a region around a high-voltage conductor can break down and ionise without a catastrophic increase in current. However, if the region of air breakdown extends to another conductor at a different voltage it creates a conductive path between them, and a large current flows through the air, creating an electric arc. Even a vacuum can suffer a sort of breakdown, but in this case the breakdown or vacuum arc involves charges ejected from the surface of metal electrodes rather than produced by the vacuum itself.

In addition, all insulators become conductors at very high temperatures as the thermal energy of the valence electrons is sufficient to put them in the conduction band.

In certain capacitors, shorts between electrodes formed due to dielectric breakdown can disappear when the applied electric field is reduced.

== Uses ==
A flexible coating of an insulator is often applied to electric wire and cable; this assembly is called insulated wire. Wires sometimes don't use an insulating coating, just air, when a solid (e.g. plastic) coating may be impractical. Wires that touch each other produce cross connections, short circuits, and fire hazards. In coaxial cable the center conductor must be supported precisely in the middle of the hollow shield to prevent electro-magnetic wave reflections. Wires that expose high voltages can cause human shock and electrocution hazards.

Most insulated wire and cable products have maximum ratings for voltage and conductor temperature. The product may not have an ampacity (current-carrying capacity) rating, since this is dependent on the surrounding environment (e.g. ambient temperature).

In electronic systems, printed circuit boards are made from epoxy plastic and fibreglass. The nonconductive boards support layers of copper foil conductors. In electronic devices, the tiny and delicate active components are embedded within nonconductive epoxy or phenolic plastics, or within baked glass or ceramic coatings.

In microelectronic components such as transistors and ICs, the silicon material is normally a conductor because of doping, but it can easily be selectively transformed into a good insulator by the application of heat and oxygen. Oxidised silicon is quartz, i.e. silicon dioxide, the primary component of glass.

In high-voltage systems containing transformers and capacitors, liquid insulator oil is the typical method used for preventing arcs. The oil replaces air in spaces that must support significant voltage without electrical breakdown. Other high-voltage system insulation materials include ceramic or glass wire holders, gas, vacuum, and simply placing wires far enough apart to use air as insulation.

== Insulation in electrical apparatus ==
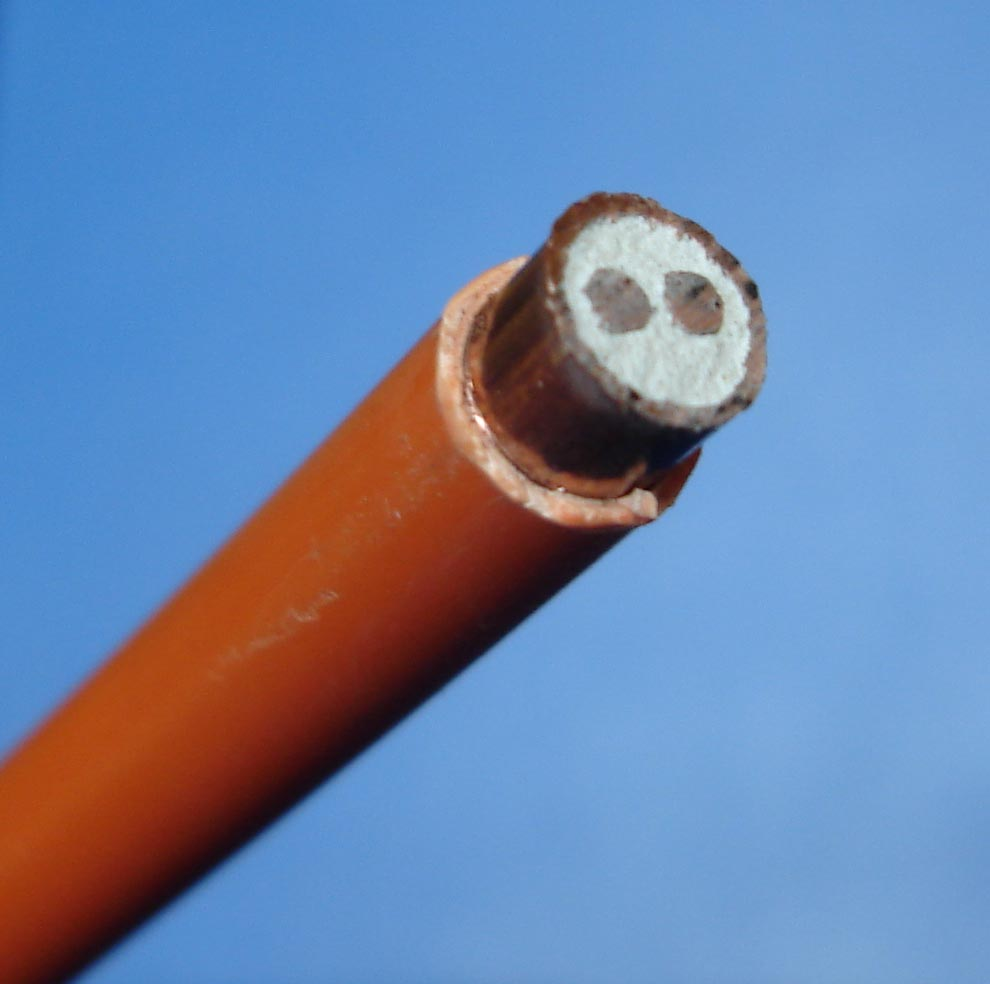
PVC-sheathed mineral-insulated copper-clad cable with two conducting cores

The most important insulation material is air. A variety of solid, liquid, and gaseous insulators are also used in electrical apparatus. In smaller transformers, generators, and electric motors, insulation on the wire coils consists of up to four thin layers of polymer varnish film. Film-insulated magnet wire permits a manufacturer to obtain the maximum number of turns within the available space. Windings that use thicker conductors are often wrapped with supplemental fiberglass insulating tape. Windings may also be impregnated with insulating varnishes to prevent electrical corona and reduce magnetically induced wire vibration. Large power transformer windings are still mostly insulated with paper, wood, varnish, and mineral oil; although these materials have been used for more than 100 years, they still provide a good balance of economy and adequate performance. Busbars and circuit breakers in switchgear may be insulated with glass-reinforced plastic insulation, treated to have low flame spread and to prevent tracking of current across the material.

In older apparatus made up to the early 1970s, boards made of compressed asbestos may be found; while this is an adequate insulator at power frequencies, handling or repairs to asbestos material can release dangerous fibers into the air and must be carried out cautiously. Wire insulated with felted asbestos was used in high-temperature and rugged applications from the 1920s. Wire of this type was sold by General Electric under the trade name "Deltabeston."

Live-front switchboards up to the early part of the 20th century were made of slate or marble. Some high-voltage equipment is designed to operate within a high pressure insulating gas such as sulfur hexafluoride. Insulation materials that perform well at power and low frequencies may be unsatisfactory at radio frequency, due to heating from excessive dielectric dissipation.

Electrical wires may be insulated with polyethylene, crosslinked polyethylene (either through electron beam processing or chemical crosslinking), PVC, Kapton, rubber-like polymers, oil impregnated paper, Teflon, silicone, or modified ethylene tetrafluoroethylene (ETFE). Larger power cables may use compressed inorganic powder, depending on the application.

Flexible insulating materials such as PVC (polyvinyl chloride) are used to insulate the circuit and prevent human contact with a 'live' wire – one having voltage of 600 volts or less. Alternative materials are likely to become increasingly used due to EU safety and environmental legislation making PVC less economic.

In electrical apparatus such as motors, generators, and transformers, various insulation systems are used, classified by their maximum recommended working temperature to achieve acceptable operating life. Materials range from upgraded types of paper to inorganic compounds.

=== Class I and Class II insulation ===
All portable or hand-held electrical devices are insulated to protect their user from harmful shock.

Class I insulation requires that the metal body and other exposed metal parts of the device be connected to earth via a grounding wire that is earthed at the main service panel—but only needs basic insulation on the conductors. This equipment needs an extra pin on the power plug for the grounding connection.

Class II insulation means that the device is double insulated. This is used on some appliances such as electric shavers, hair dryers and portable power tools. Double insulation requires that the devices have both basic and supplementary insulation, each of which is sufficient to prevent electric shock. All internal electrically energized components are totally enclosed within an insulated body that prevents any contact with "live" parts. In the EU, double insulated appliances all are marked with a symbol of two squares, one inside the other.

== Telegraph and power transmission insulators ==
Pin-type glass insulator for long-distance open-wire transmission for telephone communication

Conductors for overhead high-voltage electric power transmission are bare, and are insulated by the surrounding air. Conductors for lower voltages in distribution may have some insulation but are often bare as well. Insulating supports are required at the points where they are supported by utility poles or transmission towers. Insulators are also required where wire enters buildings or electrical devices, such as transformers or circuit breakers, for insulation from the case. Often these are bushings, which are hollow insulators with the conductor inside them.

=== Materials ===
Insulators used for high-voltage power transmission are made from glass, porcelain or composite polymer materials. Porcelain insulators are made from clay, quartz or alumina and feldspar, and are covered with a smooth glaze to shed water. Insulators made from porcelain rich in alumina are used where high mechanical strength is a criterion. Porcelain has a dielectric strength of about 4–10 kV/mm. Glass has a higher dielectric strength, but it attracts condensation and the thick irregular shapes needed for insulators are difficult to cast without internal strains. Some insulator manufacturers stopped making glass insulators in the late 1960s, switching to ceramic materials.

Some electric utilities use polymer composite materials for some types of insulators. These are typically composed of a central rod made of fibre-reinforced plastic and an outer weathershed made of silicone rubber or ethylene propylene diene monomer rubber (EPDM). Composite insulators are less costly, lighter in weight, and have excellent hydrophobic properties. This combination makes them ideal for service in polluted areas. However, these materials do not yet have the long-term proven service life of glass and porcelain.

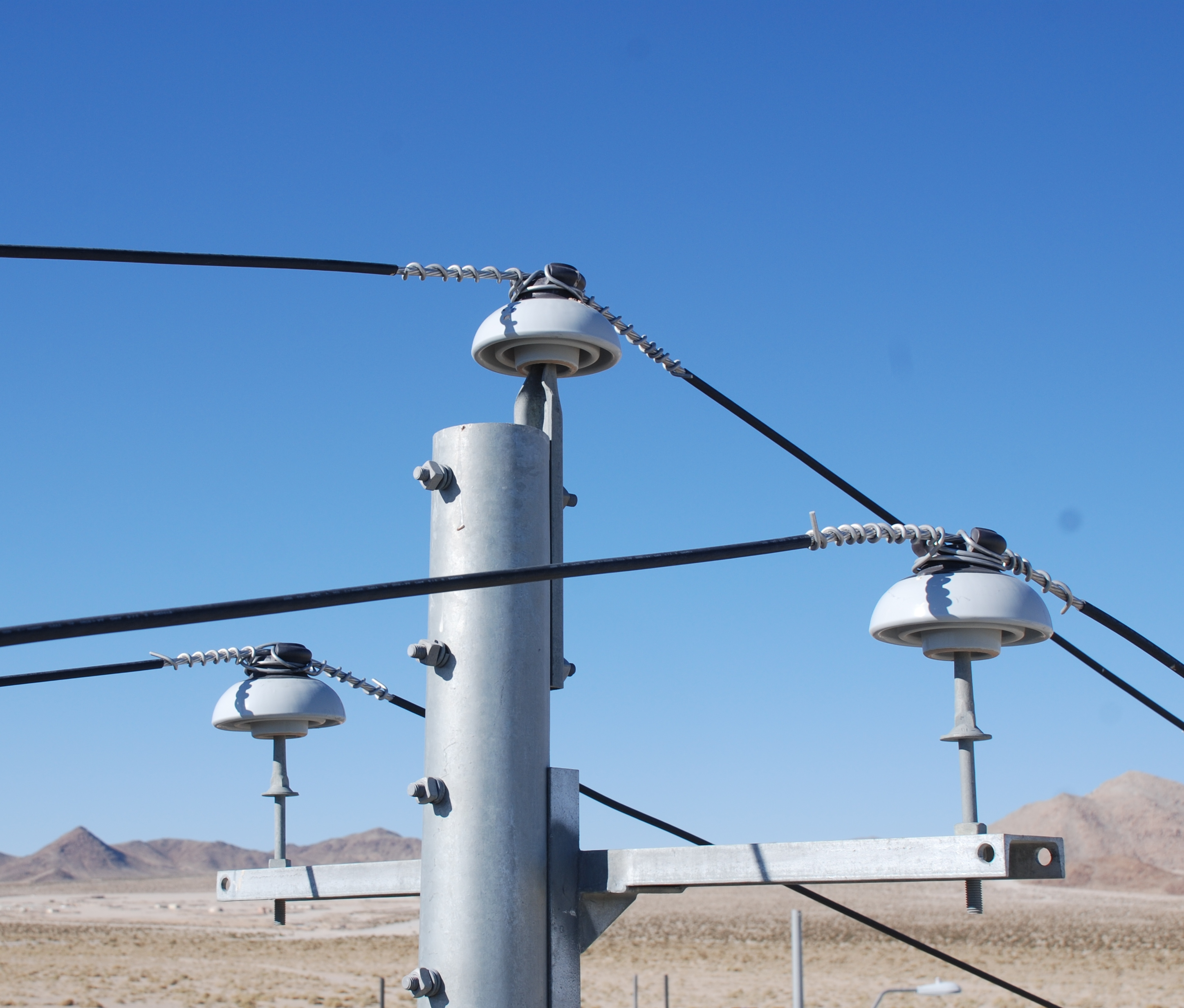
Power lines supported by ceramic pin-type insulators in California

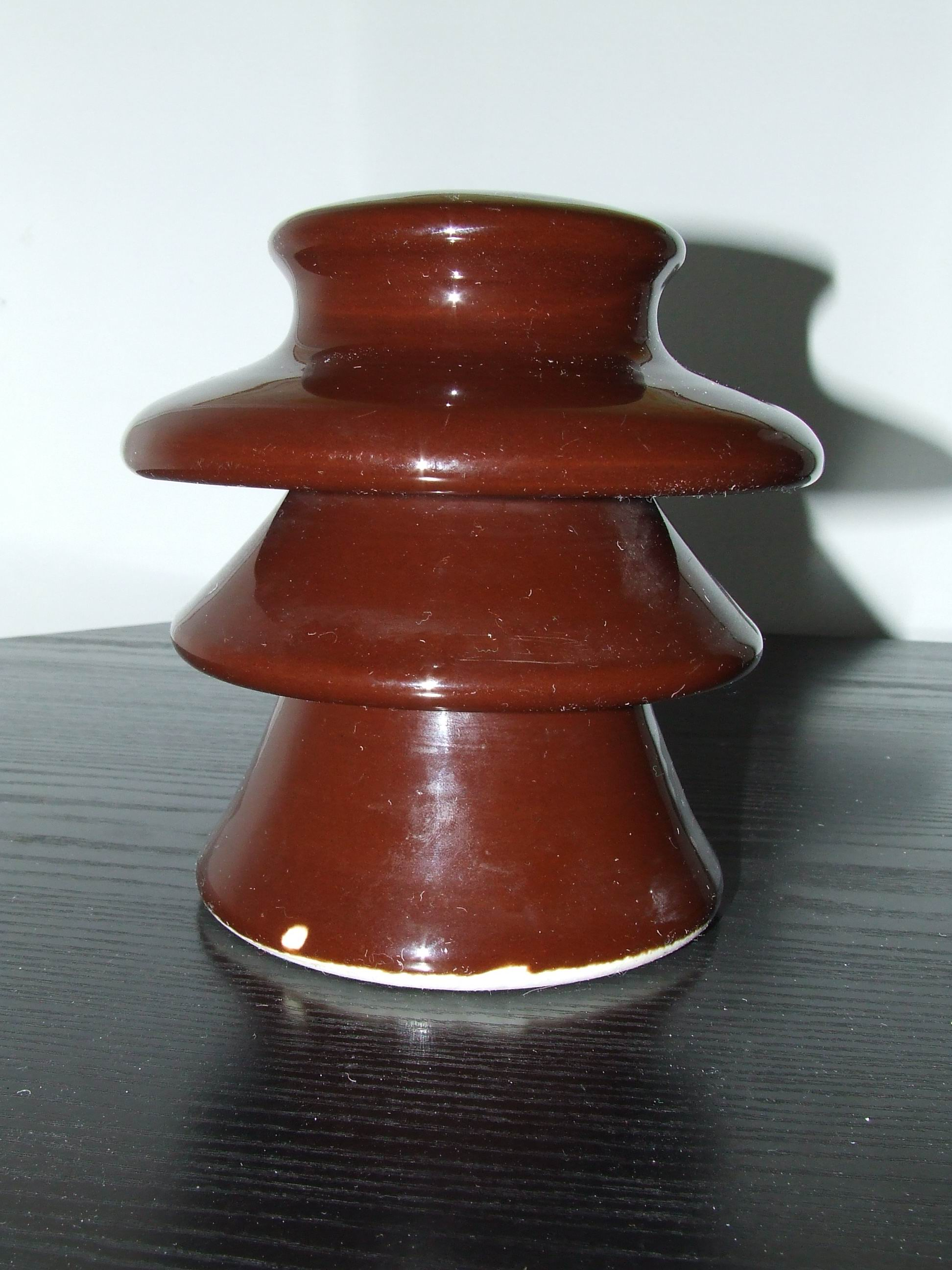
10 kV ceramic insulator, showing sheds

=== Design ===
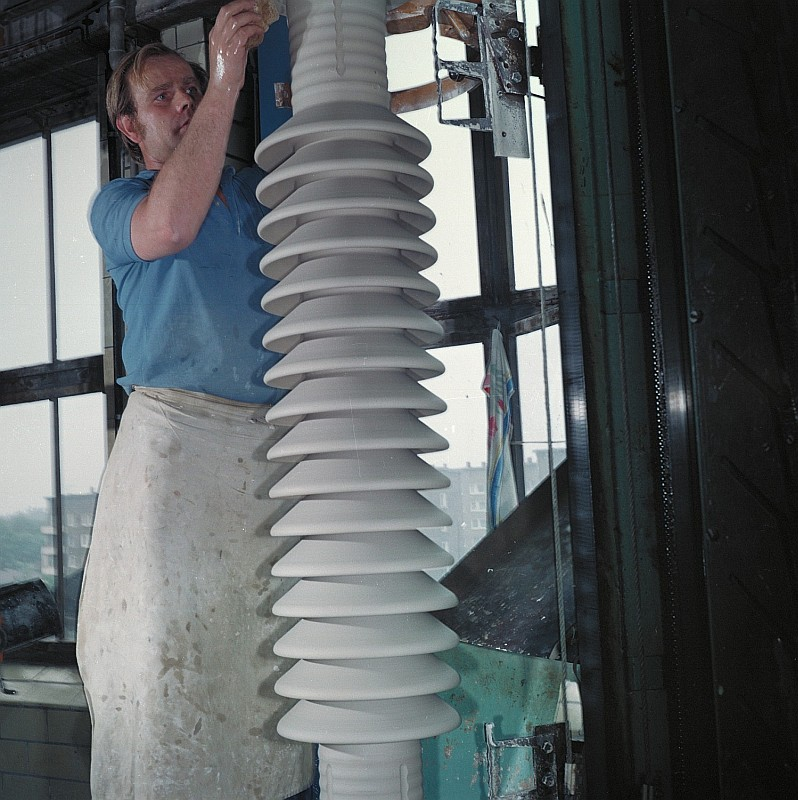
High-voltage ceramic bushing during manufacture, before glazing (1977)

The electrical breakdown of an insulator due to excessive voltage can occur in one of two ways:

- A puncture arc is a breakdown and conduction of the material of the insulator, causing an electric arc through the interior of the insulator. The heat resulting from the arc usually damages the insulator irreparably. Puncture voltage is the voltage across the insulator (when installed in its normal manner) that causes a puncture arc.
- A flashover arc is a breakdown and conduction of the air around or along the surface of the insulator, causing an arc along the outside of the insulator. Insulators are usually designed to withstand flashover without damage. Flashover voltage is the voltage that causes a flash-over arc.

Most high-voltage insulators are designed with a lower flashover voltage than puncture voltage, so they flash over before they puncture, to avoid damage.

Dirt, pollution, salt, and particularly water on the surface of a high-voltage insulator can create a conductive path across it, causing leakage currents and flashovers. The flashover voltage can be reduced by more than 50% when the insulator is wet. High-voltage insulators for outdoor use are shaped to maximise the length of the leakage path along the surface from one end to the other, called the creepage length, to minimise these leakage currents. To accomplish this the surface is moulded into a series of corrugations or concentric disc shapes. These usually include one or more sheds; downward facing cup-shaped surfaces that act as umbrellas to ensure that the part of the surface leakage path under the 'cup' stays dry in wet weather. Minimum creepage distances are 20–25 mm/kV, but must be increased in high pollution or airborne sea-salt areas.

=== Types ===
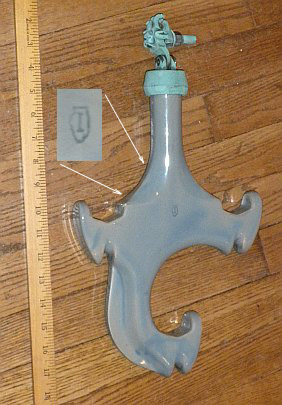
A three-phase insulator used on distribution lines, typically 13.8 kV phase to phase. The lines are held in a diamond pattern, multiple insulators used between poles.

Insulators are characterized in several common classes:

- Pin insulator - The pin-type insulator is mounted on a pin affixed on the cross-arm of the pole. The insulator has a groove near the top just below the crown. The conductor passes through this groove and is tied to the insulator with annealed wire of the same material as the conductor. Pin-type insulators are used for transmission and distribution of communication signals, and electric power at voltages up to 33 kV. Insulators made for operating voltages between 33 kV and 69 kV tend to be bulky and have become uneconomical.
- Post insulator - A type of insulator in the 1930s that is more compact than traditional pin-type insulators and which has rapidly replaced many pin-type insulators on lines up to 69 kV and in some configurations, can be made for operation at up to 115 kV.
- Suspension insulator - For voltages greater than 33 kV, it is a usual practice to use suspension type insulators, consisting of a number of glass or porcelain discs connected in series by metal links in the form of a string. The conductor is suspended at the bottom end of this string while the top end is secured to the cross-arm of the tower. The number of disc units used depends on the voltage.
- Strain insulator - A dead end or anchor pole or tower is used where a straight section of line ends, or angles off in another direction. These poles must withstand the lateral (horizontal) tension of the long straight section of wire. To support this lateral load, strain insulators are used. For low-voltage lines (less than 11 kV), shackle insulators are used as strain insulators. However, for high-voltage transmission lines, strings of cap-and-pin (suspension) insulators are used, attached to the crossarm in a horizontal direction. When the tension load in lines is exceedingly high, such as at long river spans, two or more strings are used in parallel.
- Shackle insulator - In early days, the shackle insulators were used as strain insulators. But nowaday, they are frequently used for low-voltage distribution lines. Such insulators can be used either in a horizontal position or in a vertical position. They can be directly fixed to the pole with a bolt or to the cross arm.
- Bushing - enables one or several conductors to pass through a partition such as a wall or a tank, and insulates the conductors from it.
- Line post insulator
- Station post insulator
- Cut-out

=== Sheath insulator ===
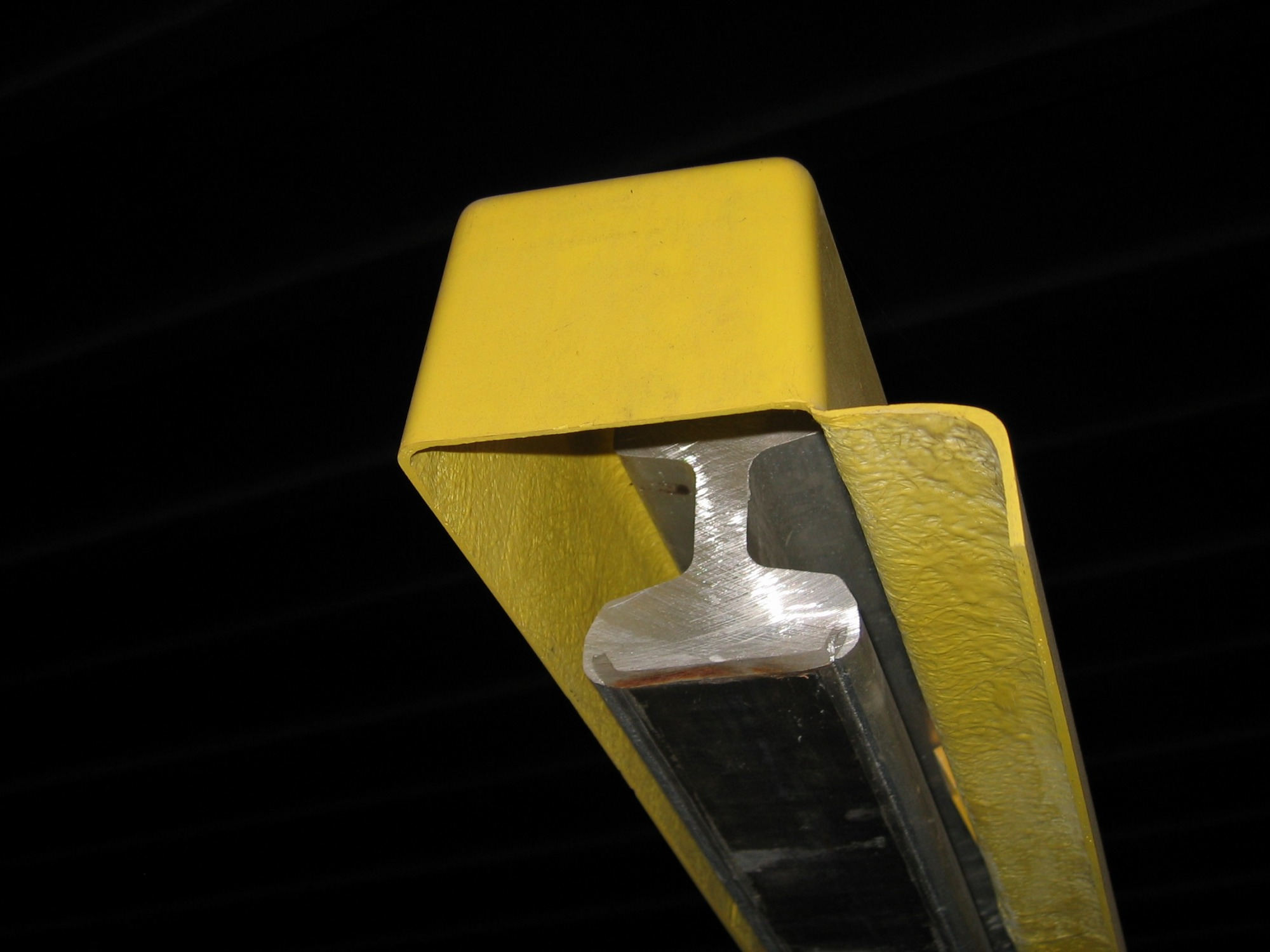
Bottom-contact third rail in a sheath insulator

Sheath insulators are protective covers designed to wrap around the length of a bottom-contact third rail; they create a continuous safety barrier that prevents accidental electrical conduction or human contact with the live power source.

Sheath insulators are frequently manufactured using epoxy because the material remains stable over long periods and prevents electricity from flowing where it is not intended. These components work as a protective barrier around the conductive parts of cables and electrical systems; they help isolate the metal layers to stop unwanted currents from leaking into the surrounding environment.

Ceramic is an alternative material for these insulators and is utilized alongside plastic components to enhance the overall strength of the assembly. Plastic provides flexibility and a lower weight while ceramic maintains its physical properties under high temperatures and high voltage levels.

=== Suspension insulators ===
Typical number of disc insulator units for standard line voltages
Line voltage (kV)	Discs
34.5	3
69	4
115	6
138	8
161	11
230	14
287	15
345	18
360	23
400	24
500	34
600	44
750	59
765	60

Pin-type insulators are unsuitable for voltages greater than about 69 kV line-to-line. Higher voltage transmission lines usually use modular suspension insulator designs. The wires are suspended from a 'string' of identical disc-shaped insulators that attach to each other with metal clevis pin or ball-and-socket links. The advantage of this design is that insulator strings with different breakdown voltages, for use with different line voltages, can be constructed by using different numbers of the basic units. String insulators can be made for any practical transmission voltage by adding insulator elements to the string. Also, if one of the insulator units in the string breaks, it can be replaced without discarding the entire string.

Each unit is constructed of a ceramic or glass disc with a metal cap and pin cemented to opposite sides. To make defective units obvious, glass units are designed so that an overvoltage causes a puncture arc through the glass instead of a flashover. The glass is heat-treated so it shatters, making the damaged unit visible. However, the mechanical strength of the unit is unchanged, so the insulator string stays together. In contrast, porcelain offers advantages in specific high-voltage applications. Unlike glass, porcelain can be cast into highly complex and irregular shapes, allowing for custom stress-distribution designs that are difficult to achieve with glass due to internal strains during cooling. The material's high dielectric strength—approximately 60\text{ kV/cm}—remains stable across a wide range of temperatures, providing consistent performance in extreme environments. Furthermore, porcelain's opaque clay body is naturally resistant to ultraviolet degradation and chemical corrosion, ensuring a service life that often exceeds 30 years without the loss of electrical resistance. While glass insulators are prone to spontaneous shattering from surface imperfections or thermal shock, porcelain maintains superior mechanical stability under heavy tensile and compressive loads, making it a reliable standard for substation equipment.

Standard suspension disc insulator units are 25 centimetres (9.8 in) in diameter and 15 cm (6 in) long, can support a load of 80–120 kilonewtons (18,000–27,000 lb_{f}), have a dry flashover voltage of about 72 kV, and are rated at an operating voltage of 10–12 kV. However, the flashover voltage of a string is less than the sum of its component discs, because the electric field is not distributed evenly across the string but is strongest at the disc nearest to the conductor, which flashes over first. Metal grading rings are sometimes added around the disc at the high-voltage end, to reduce the electric field across that disc and improve flashover voltage.

In very-high-voltage lines the insulator may be surrounded by corona rings. These typically consist of toruses of aluminium (most commonly) or copper tubing attached to the line. They are designed to reduce the electric field at the point where the insulator is attached to the line, to prevent corona discharge, which results in power losses.

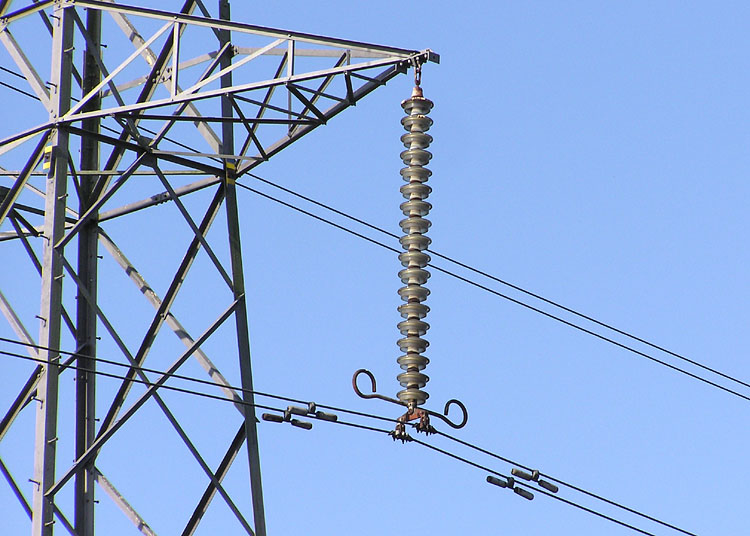
Suspension insulator string (the vertical string of discs) on a 275 kV suspension pylon

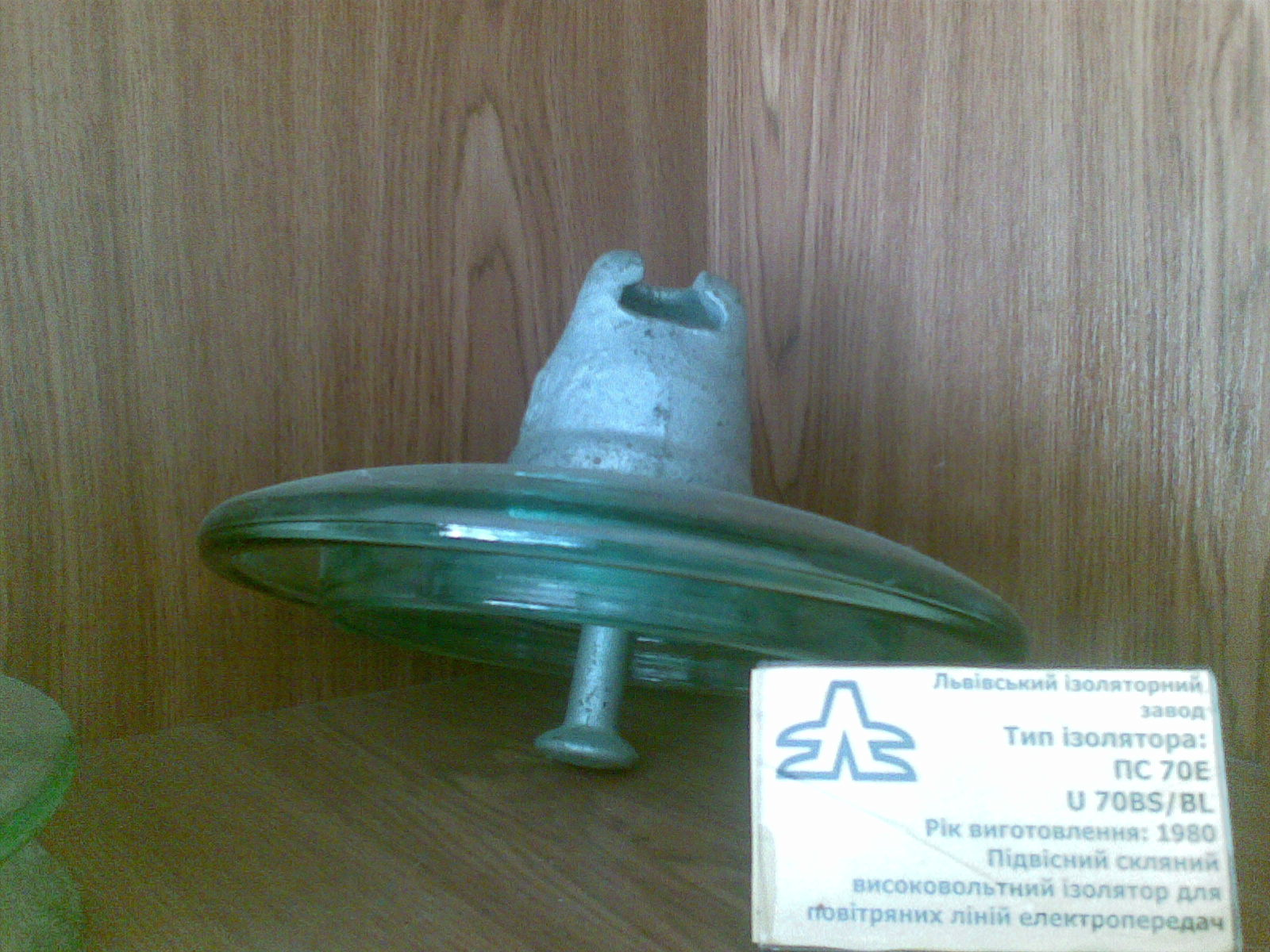
Suspended glass disc insulator unit used in suspension insulator strings for high-voltage transmission lines

=== History ===
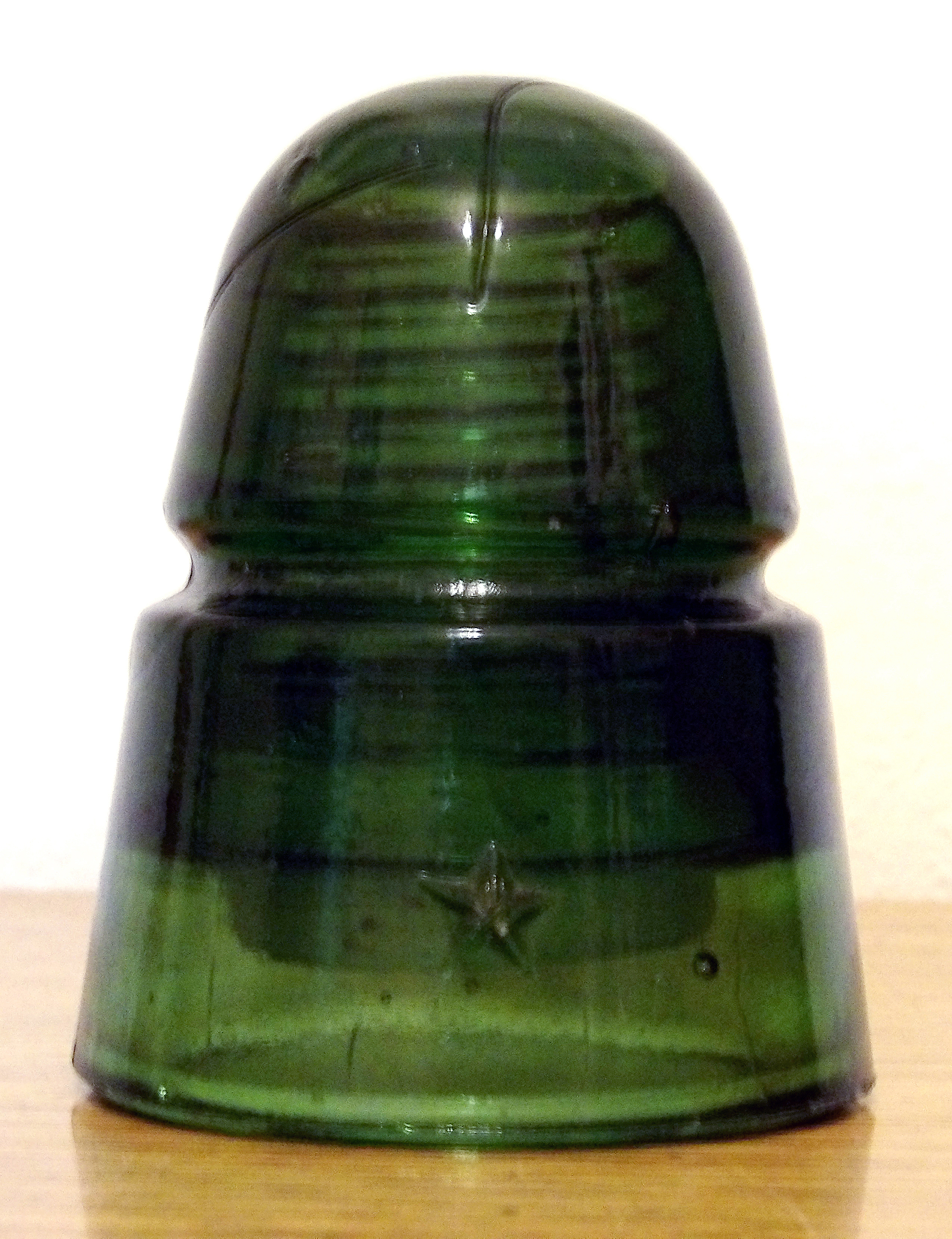
A "Beehive" insulator likely produced by the Brookfield Glass Company; the embossed star was a customer marking.

The first electrical systems to make use of insulators were telegraph lines; direct attachment of wires to wooden poles was found to give very poor results, especially during damp weather.

In the earliest experimental phases of the telegraph, developers utilized common industrial materials like wood and rubber before ceramic and glass standards were established. William Fothergill Cooke initially employed polished wooden blocks to support bare wires along the Great Western Railway, often treating them with tar or pitch to improve moisture resistance. Similarly, India rubber and gutta-percha—a natural latex resin—were utilized as flexible insulators for early wiring and submarine cables due to their waterproof nature. However, both materials proved inadequate for long-term outdoor use: wood frequently absorbed water and became conductive, leading to signal failure, while rubber components suffered from ultraviolet degradation and severe cracking when exposed to the elements. These persistent failures driven by weather exposure eventually necessitated the shift toward more chemically stable and weather-resistant stoneware and glass by the mid-1840s.

Glass was initially popular as a primary insulating material due to its low production cost and excellent dielectric properties. In the United States, Ezra Cornell introduced glass "bureau knobs" by 1844, which evolved into tbell-shaped insulators mass-produced by firms like the New England Glass Company. While glass was highly effective in dry environments and allowed for easy visual inspection of internal flaws, its tendency to collect surface moisture and its vulnerability to thermal shock often made British stoneware a preferred standard for railway telecommunications through the 1850s. By the 1860s, these early friction-fit components evolved into the threaded porcelain and toughened glass insulators that supported the global expansion of the telegraphic network.

The first widespread use of ceramic electrical insulators occurred between 1855 and 1860. These early units were made of glazed porcelain or brown stoneware and were developed to replace glass, which proved less effective in damp conditions.

Amongst the first to produce ceramic insulators were companies in the United Kingdom, with Stiff and Doulton using stoneware from the mid-1840s, Joseph Bourne (later renamed Denby) producing them from around 1860 and Bullers from 1868. C. F. Varley patented several stoneware designs in 1861, including the "Z" type, which became a standard for railway telecommunications throughout the 1870s.

By the 1890s, porcelain had become the global standard for high-voltage transmission due to its strength and dielectric properties.

The development of the suspension insulator was a pivotal advancement that enabled the expansion of modern high-voltage power transmission. Prior to this innovation, the industry relied on pin insulator designs; however, as transmission line voltages approached and exceeded 60,000 V, these units became prohibitively large and heavy. Manufacturing and installation constraints effectively set a practical limit at approximately 88,000 V for a single-piece unit due to the extreme mechanical and electrical stresses involved.

Suspension-type insulators overcame these limitations by utilising a modular design. Each unit consists of a porcelain or glass disc with a metal cap and pin, allowing them to be connected into insulator strings of any necessary length to match the specific voltage of the line. This flexibility not only facilitates higher transmission voltages—often exceeding 500,000 V—but also ensures that the mechanical load is distributed, maintaining the structural integrity of the pylon and conductor assembly.

== Insulation of antennas ==
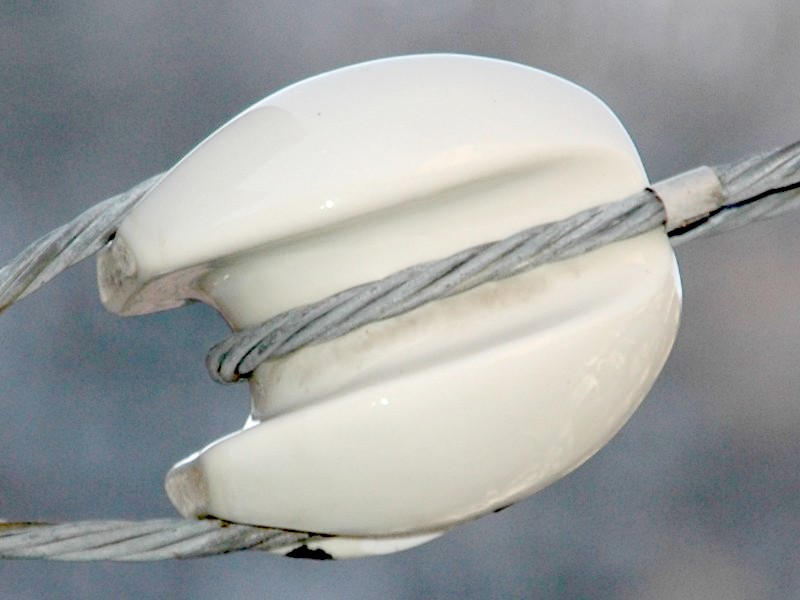
Egg-shaped strain insulator

Often a broadcasting radio antenna is built as a mast radiator, which means that the entire mast structure is energised with high voltage and must be insulated from the ground. Steatite mountings are used. They have to withstand not only the voltage of the mast radiator to ground, which can reach values up to 400 kV at some antennas, but also the weight of the mast construction and dynamic forces. Arcing horns and lightning arresters are necessary because lightning strikes to the mast are common.

Guy wires supporting antenna masts usually have strain insulators inserted in the cable run, to keep the high voltages on the antenna from short circuiting to ground or creating a shock hazard. Often guy cables have several insulators, placed to break up the cable into lengths that prevent unwanted electrical resonances in the guy. These insulators are usually ceramic and cylindrical or egg-shaped (see picture). This construction has the advantage that the ceramic is under compression rather than tension, so it can withstand greater load, and that if the insulator breaks, the cable ends are still linked.

These insulators also have to be equipped with overvoltage protection equipment. For the dimensions of the guy insulation, static charges on guys have to be considered. For high masts, these can be much higher than the voltage caused by the transmitter, requiring guys divided by insulators in multiple sections on the highest masts. In this case, guys which are grounded at the anchor basements via a coil - or if possible, directly - are the better choice.

Feedlines attaching antennas to radio equipment, particularly twin-lead type, often must be kept at a distance from metal structures. The insulated supports used for this purpose are called standoff insulators.

== See also ==
- Lightning rod
- Stephen Gray – English physicist
  - Electrical conductor
- Dielectric material
- Electrical conductivity
