= List of Glass Companies Led by Former Employees of Hobbs, Brockunier and Company =

This is a list of glass factories with ties to the J. H. Hobbs, Brockunier and Company glass works in Wheeling, West Virginia. This company was one of the leading glass manufacturers in the United States during the 19th Century. Former employees of the Hobbs works were essential employees, founders, or top management for over 20 glass factories in West Virginia, Ohio, Pennsylvania, and Indiana. Wheeling's Hobbs glass works was renamed multiple times during its existence of approximately 60 years. Listed below are names used by the Hobbs glass works.

- Barnes, Hobbs & Company
- Hobbs, Barnes & Company
- Barnes, Hobbs & Company
- Hobbs & Barnes
- J. H. Hobbs, Brockunier & Company
- Hobbs, Brockunier & Company
- Hobbs Glass Company
- Factory H of United States Glass Company

== Glass factories ==
Glass factories tied to former employees of the Hobbs and Brockunier glass works are listed below in the sortable list. The first five categories in the list can be sorted. The list's default sort orders the properties alphabetically by name. Notes are listed in the last section.

	Company	City	State	Year	Employees	Notes
1	Beatty-Brady Glass Company	Dunkirk	Indiana	1896	Charles N. Brady	Former J.H. Hobbs, Brockunier and Company salesman Charles N. Brady was on the board of directors of this company.
1	Bellaire Goblet Company	Bellaire/Findlay	Ohio	1876	John Robinson, Charles Henry Over	Former Hobbs and Belmont Glass employees Robinson and Over were among the founders of this company. Over was plant's original manager, while Robinson was the plant's original superintendent. Robinson replaced Over as plant manager when the factory moved to Findlay in 1888.
2	Belmont Glass Company	Bellaire	Ohio	1861	John Robinson, Charles Henry Over, Henry Crimmel	Robinson, Over, and Crimmel left the Hobbs works to help start this factory. Robinson was plant superintendent.
3	Bonita Art Glass Company	Wheeling	West Virginia	1901	Otto Jaeger	Former Hobbs manager Jaeger was company's first president and part owner.
4	C. H. Over Glass Company	Muncie	Indiana	1889	Charles Henry Over	Former Hobbs, Bellaire Glass, and Bellaire Goblet employee C. Henry Over started this window glass company after Bellaire Goblet moved from Bellaire, Ohio, to Findlay.
5	Central Glass Company	Wheeling	West Virginia	1863	John Oesterling, John Henderson, Peter Cassel	Co-op started by a group of former Barnes & Hobbs employees. Original 1863 company name was Oesterling, Henderson, and Co. Incorporated as Central Glass Co. in 1867. Former Hobbs employees Oesterling, first president, had been a mold maker, Henderson had been an engineer, and Cassel had been a glassblower.
6	Dalzell, Gilmore & Leighton Company	Findlay	Ohio	1888	William F. Russell, William Leighton Jr.	Originally incorporated as Dalzell Brothers & Gilmore Glass Company. Former Hobbs supervisor Russell was first plant manager. Company changed name before operations began when former Hobbs executive William Leighton Jr. agreed to join firm as part owner. Leighton was considered "a colored glass expert and an outstanding production technician."
7	Fostoria Glass Company	Fostoria/Moundsville	Ohio/West Virginia	1887	Lucian B. Martin, William S. Brady, James B. Russell, Benjamin M. Hildreth, Otto Jaeger, Henry Crimmel, Jacob Crimmel	Former Hobbs sales executive Martin was first president. Brady, a former bookkeeper at Hobbs, was company secretary. Russell, a former Hobbs manager, was the first plant manager. Former Hobbs salesmen Hildreth was sales manager. Both Crimmels worked at Hobbs, and were employee shareholders of the Fostoria company. Crimmel glass recipes were used to mix batches of glass during the company's earliest days.
8	Fostoria Shade and Lamp Company	Fostoria	Ohio	1890	William S. Brady, Nicholas Kopp Jr.	Former Hobbs bookkeeper Brady was on board of directors. Former Hobbs glass mixer Kopp directed operations.
9	H. Northwood & Company	Wheeling	West Virginia	1901	Harry Northwood	Harry Northwood, former etcher at Hobbs & Brockunier, founded this company in the old Hobbs glass works.
10	Hazel Glass Company	Washington	Pennsylvania	1885	Charles N. Brady	Former Hobbs bookkeeper and salesman Charles N. Brady founded this company and was first president.
11	King, Son and Company	Pittsburgh	Pennsylvania	1869	James B. Russell	Former Hobbs employee was manager of this Pittsburgh glass plant.
12	Kopp Glass Company	Swissvale	Pennsylvania	1900	Nickolas Kopp Jr.	Former Hobbs employee Kopp was famous for his ruby–colored glass, and was considered one of the industry's greatest chemists.
13	Libbey Glass Company	Toledo	Ohio	1888	Michael Joseph Owens	As plant superintendent, former Hobbs worker Owens helped rescue financially–troubled company.
14	Libbey–Owens Sheet Glass Company	Toledo	Ohio	1916	Michael Joseph Owens	Company formed by Edward Libbey and former Hobbs employee Michael Owens to market window glass made by machine developed by Owens and Irving Wightman Colburn.
15	Nickel Plate Glass Company	Fostoria	Ohio	1888	Benjamin M. Hildreth, James B. Russell	Former Hobbs and Fostoria employees Hildreth (secretary) and Russell (manager) were among the founders of the company.
16	Novelty Glass Company	Tiffin	Ohio	1891	Henry Crimmel	Crimmel was plant manager and one of the founders.
17	Owens Bottle Machine Company	Toledo	Ohio	1903	Michael Joseph Owens	Formed by former Hobbs worker Owens and Edward Libbey to market the Owens bottle machine.
18	Riverside Glass Company	Wellsburg	West Virginia	1879	William S. Brady, Charles N. Brady	Former Hobbs bookkeeper and salesman Charles N. Brady organized this company and was president. His brother, former Hobbs bookkeeper William Brady was secretary and general manager, and eventually became president.
19	Robinson Glass Company	Zainsville	Ohio	1893	John Robinson	John Robinson was president and son Edwin was secretary-treasurer.
20	Seneca Glass Company	Fostoria	Ohio	1891	Otto Jaeger	Former Hobbs manager Jaeger was company's first president and part owner.
21	Sneath Glass Company	Tiffin/Hartford City	Ohio/Indiana	1892	Henry Crimmel	Crimmel was plant manager and part owner of reorganized version restarted in Indiana during 1894.
22	Toledo Glass Company	Toledo	Ohio	1895	Michael Joseph Owens	Research firm formed by Michael Owens and Edward D. Libbey.
