= George Close Company Building =

- U.S. National Register of Historic Places
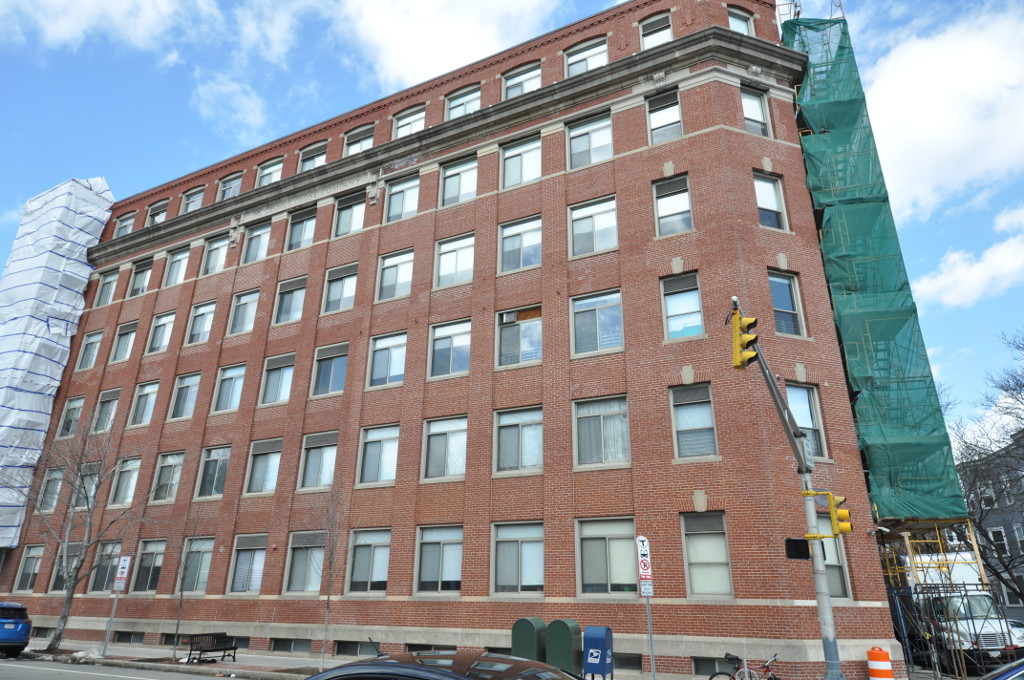

- Location within Massachusetts Location within the United States
- Location: 243 Broadway, Cambridge, Massachusetts
- Coordinates: 42°22′2″N 71°05′44″W
- Built: 1910
- Architectural style: Classical Revival
- NRHP reference No.: 100003472
- Added to NRHP: March 15, 2019

The George Close Company Building is a historic industrial building at 243 Broadway in Cambridge, Massachusetts. Built in 1910 for a candy manufacturer, it is a good local example of industrial Classical Revival architecture and was converted to residential use in 1976. The building was added to the National Register of Historic Places in 2019.

== Description and history ==
The former George Close Company building is located in the Wellington-Harrington neighborhood of Cambridge, on the western outskirts of Kendall Square. It stands at the northwest corner of Broadway and Windsor Street on not-quite-rectangular site, and is a brick structure six stories in height. Its street-facing facades are adorned with Classical Revival details in brick and cast stone, and it has an angled one-bay facade at the street corner. The interior retains a number of original period features, despite its conversion to residential use.

The George Close Company was founded in 1872, and was one of Cambridge's leading candy manufacturers, one of its major industries in the late 19th century. The building at 243 Broadway was constructed in 1910, and was the largest of the firm's three factories. The company was best known for its penny candy and sets of baseball cards. It filed for bankruptcy in 1939. This building was acquired by another manufacturer in 1941, producing laboratory and other medical equipment. It remained in industrial use until 1971. In 1976 it was the subject of one of the region's first historically sensitive renovations of a large industrial building for residential use.

== See also ==
- National Register of Historic Places listings in Cambridge, Massachusetts
