= James B. Barnes House =

Historic house in Massachusetts, United States

- U.S. National Register of Historic Places
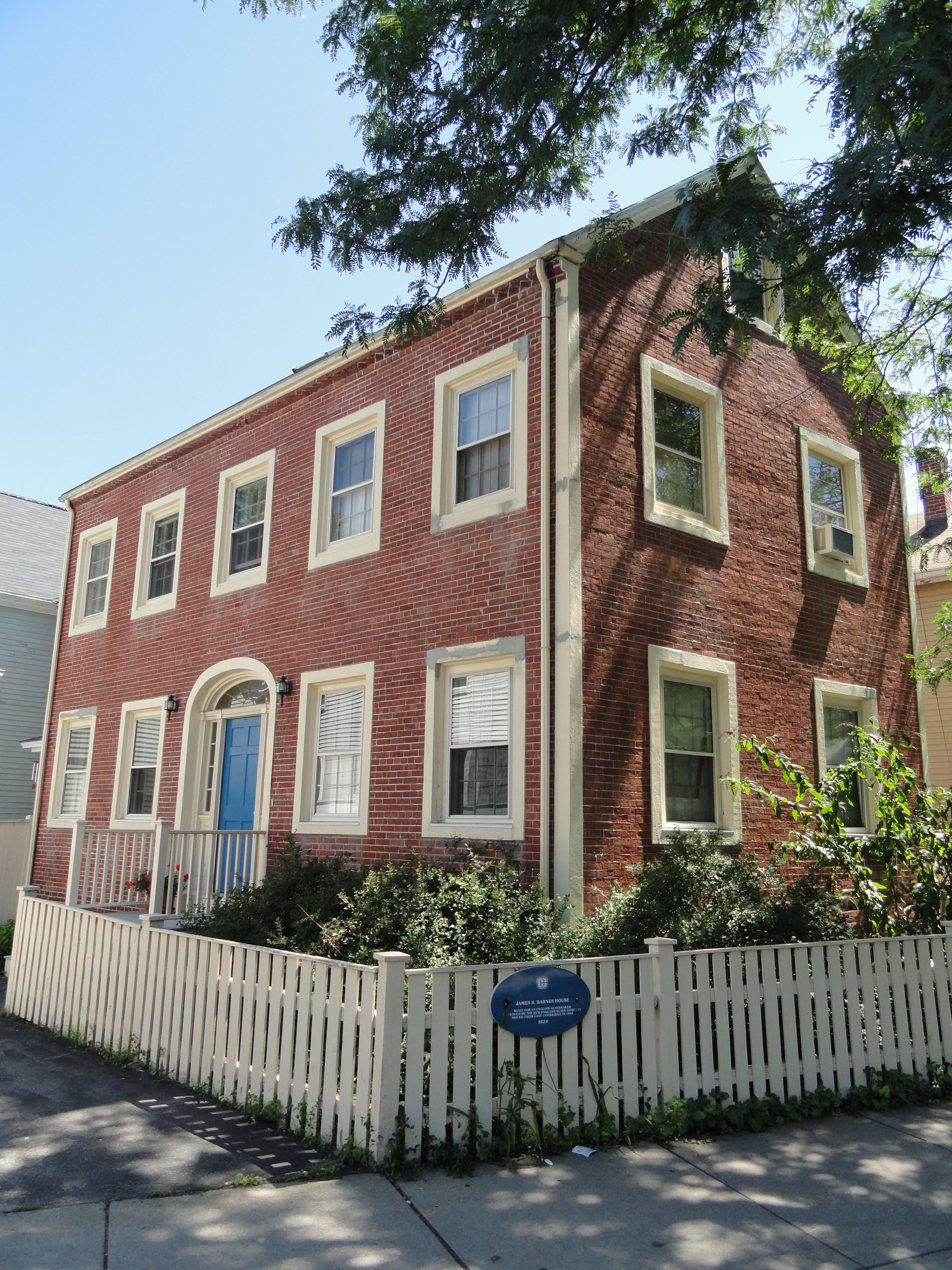

- Location within Massachusetts Location within the United States
- Location: 109 Hampshire St., Cambridge, Massachusetts
- Coordinates: 42°22′11.0″N 71°05′44.4″W
- Area: less than one acre
- Built: 1824
- Architectural style: Federal
- MPS: Cambridge MRA
- NRHP reference No.: 82001919
- Added to NRHP: April 13, 1982

The James B. Barnes House is an historic house at 109 Hampshire Street, Cambridge, Massachusetts. Built in 1824 and moved to its present location in 1984, it is one of the only brick Federal-style houses left in Cambridge, and is a rare survivor of the early period of development in East Cambridge. It was listed on the National Register of Historic Places in 1982.

== Description and history ==
The James Barnes House now stands in Cambridge's Wellington-Harrington neighborhood, set facing west on the north side of Hampshire Street between Columbia and Union Streets. It is a 2 1/2-story brick structure, with a side gable roof. It is five bays wide and two deep, with a center entrance set in an opening with a Federal style fanlight.

The house was built in 1824 for an English glassmaker employed at the New England Glass Company. In 1910 it was moved within its original lot facing Monsignor O'Brien Highway to accommodate a road widening project. It was moved to its present location in 1984. The house is distinctive in Cambridge as a rare example Federal period brick architecture, the only such example with a fanlight above the entrance. It is also one of the few residential buildings to survive from the early years of East Cambridge's development.

== See also ==
- National Register of Historic Places listings in Cambridge, Massachusetts
- J. H. Hobbs, Brockunier and Company
