= Charles N. Brady =

American businessman (1849–1938)

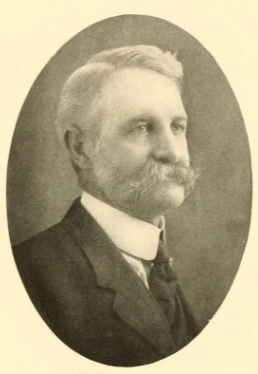
- Born: May 29, 1849; Wheeling, West Virginia
- Died: July 6, 1938; Washington, Pennsylvania
- Occupation: Capitalist
- Known for: glass making
- Spouse: Mary Elizabeth Paxton
- Children: Flora Paxton Brady Donnan, Richard Meldrum Brady, Mary Louise Brady

Charles Neave Brady (born Wheeling, West Virginia, May 29, 1849; died Washington, Pennsylvania, July 6, 1938) was an American businessman and innovator prominent in the glass industry. He was the first president of the Hazel-Atlas Glass Company.

== Early life ==
Brady was the son of Hugh Sobieski Brady (1816–1880); a banker who served as city councilman and mayor in Wheeling, state treasurer, and Secretary of State. His mother was Mary Elizabeth Scoville Caldwell Brady (1821–1897), daughter of Judge Alexander Caldwell. Brady was raised and educated in Wheeling.

== Career ==
After working for glassmaker J. H. Hobbs, Brockunier and Company in Wheeling, Brady's first business venture was the Riverside Glass Company in nearby Wellsburg, founded in 1879. It was the first glass factory in the United States to be powered entirely by natural gas. In 1885 Brady and partner C. H. Tallman founded the Hazel Glass Company in Wheeling to make glass inserts for mason jar lids; in 1886 the company expanded to a new plant in Washington, Pennsylvania and soon branched out to produce small ointment jars and other products. Under Brady's direction, Hazel made use of the new annealing lehr kiln.

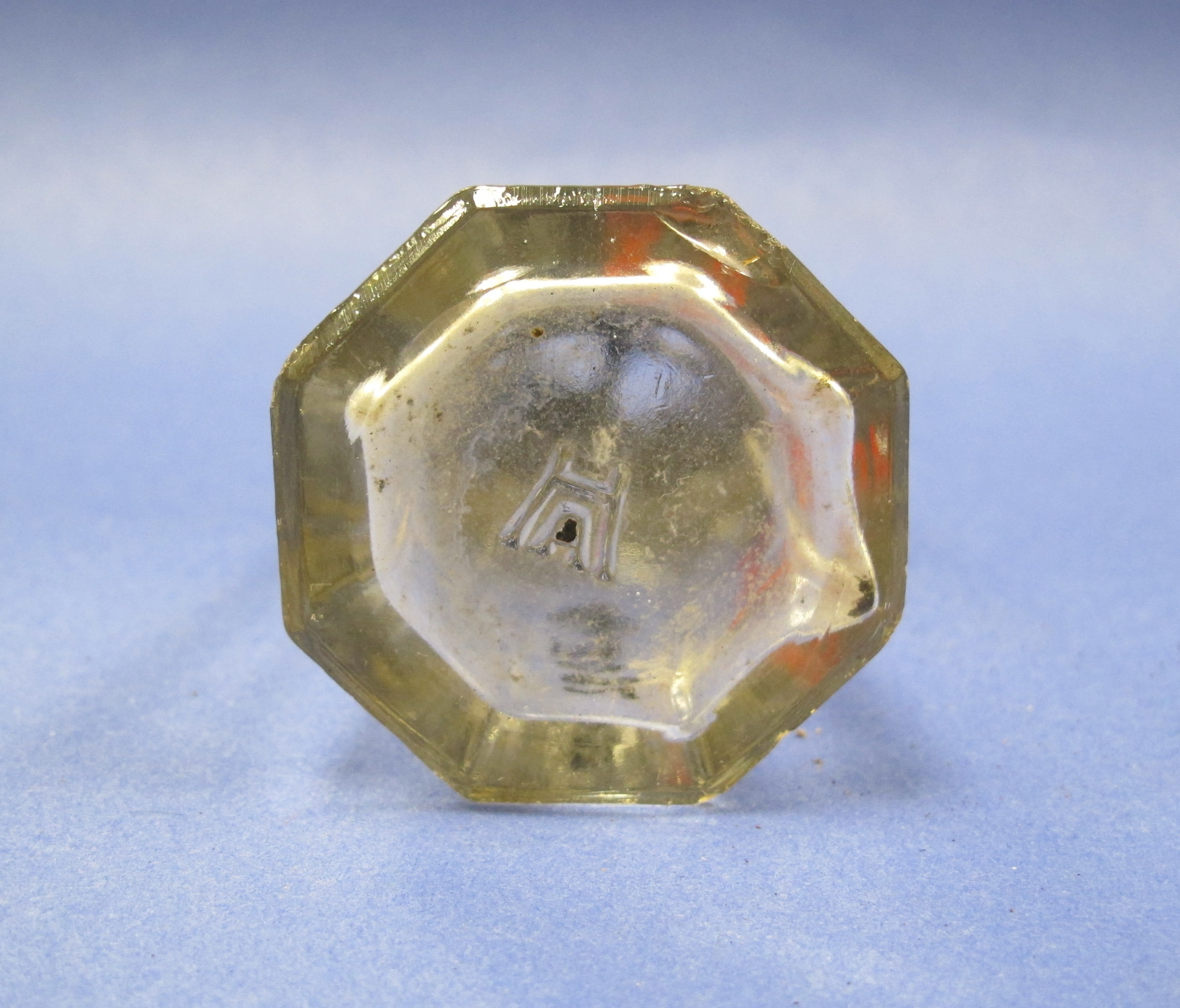
The Hazel-Atlas mark, seen on a glass salt shaker recovered from the RMS Niagara, sunk 1940

In 1896 Brady started a new company, Atlas Glass, to manufacture fruit jars. In 1902 Hazel, Atlas, Republic Glass (owned by Brady's brother William Sobieski Brady (1853–1923)), and Wheeling Metal Company (a maker of zinc caps, owned by another brother, Joseph Caldwell Brady (1851–1932)) combined into the Hazel-Atlas Glass Company with Charles Brady as the first president.

Looking for innovations, Brady invested money in the Wheeling Mold and Foundry Company; owner Charles Blue developed the Blue Machine, an important advance in automating glass production. Hazel-Atlas licensed glass production technology developed by Michael Joseph Owens from the Libbey Glass Company. Brady's obituary said he was called the "Thomas A. Edison of the glass industry" in his hometown.

Brady resigned as president of Hazel-Atlas in 1918 and after a brief stint as chairman of the board retired from business.

Brady was also for forty years a trustee of Washington & Jefferson College and a director of Citizens National Bank, both in Washington, Pennsylvania.

== Private life ==
Brady married Mary Elizabeth Paxton (1856–1931) in 1881; they had three children: Flora Paxton Brady Donnan (1884–1977), Richard Meldrum Brady (1886–1960), and Mary Louise Brady (1890–1972).

Brady died of pneumonia two months after suffering a fall at his home. He is buried in Washington Cemetery in Washington, Pennsylvania.
