= J. H. Hobbs, Brockunier and Company =

United States glass manufacturer of the 19th century

- Type: Co-partnership, corporation
- Industry: Glass manufacturing
- Predecessor: Plunkett and Miller
- Founded: 1845
- Founder: James B. Barnes, John L. Hobbs
- Defunct: 1891
- Fate: Sold
- Successor: United States Glass Company, Factory H
- Headquarters: Wheeling, West Virginia
- Key people: John H. Hobbs, Charles W. Brockunier, William Leighton Sr.
- Products: Flint and fancy-colored glassware
- Revenue: $325,000 (1873)
- Number of employees: 350 (1877)

J. H. Hobbs, Brockunier and Company was one of the largest and best-known manufacturers of glass in the United States during the 19th century. Its products were distributed worldwide. The company is responsible for one of the greatest innovations in American glassmaking—an improved formula for lime glass that enabled American glass manufacturers to produce high-quality glass at a lower cost. The firm also developed talented glassmakers that started glass factories in Ohio and Indiana.

The firm was first organized as Barnes, Hobbs and Company in 1845 by James B. Barnes and John L. Hobbs. Both men held supervisory positions at the New England Glass Company in Massachusetts before starting their business venture. They came to a small community near the south side of Wheeling, Virginia, to begin their new glassmaking partnership. The company's glass factory was known as the South Wheeling Glass Works. The firm was reorganized multiple times during the 50 years following 1845, but members of the Hobbs family were always part of the ownership. During its peak notoriety, the company was named J. H. Hobbs, Brockunier and Company. This version of the firm was organized in 1863 as a co-partnership between John L. Hobbs, son John H. Hobbs, and Charles W. Brockunier. Its products were mostly pressed and blown tableware.

In 1891, the Hobbs Glass Company joined the United States Glass Company trust. The trust controlled over a dozen glass plants. In 1893, the trust closed the Hobbs Wheeling Glass Works. It remained closed until 1902 when the property was sold to Harry Northwood—a former employee of J. H. Hobbs, Brockunier and Company. Northwood's new glass factory, named H. Northwood and Company, employed 300 people and was a successful producer of tableware until 1925.

== Background ==
=== Glassmaking in the United States ===
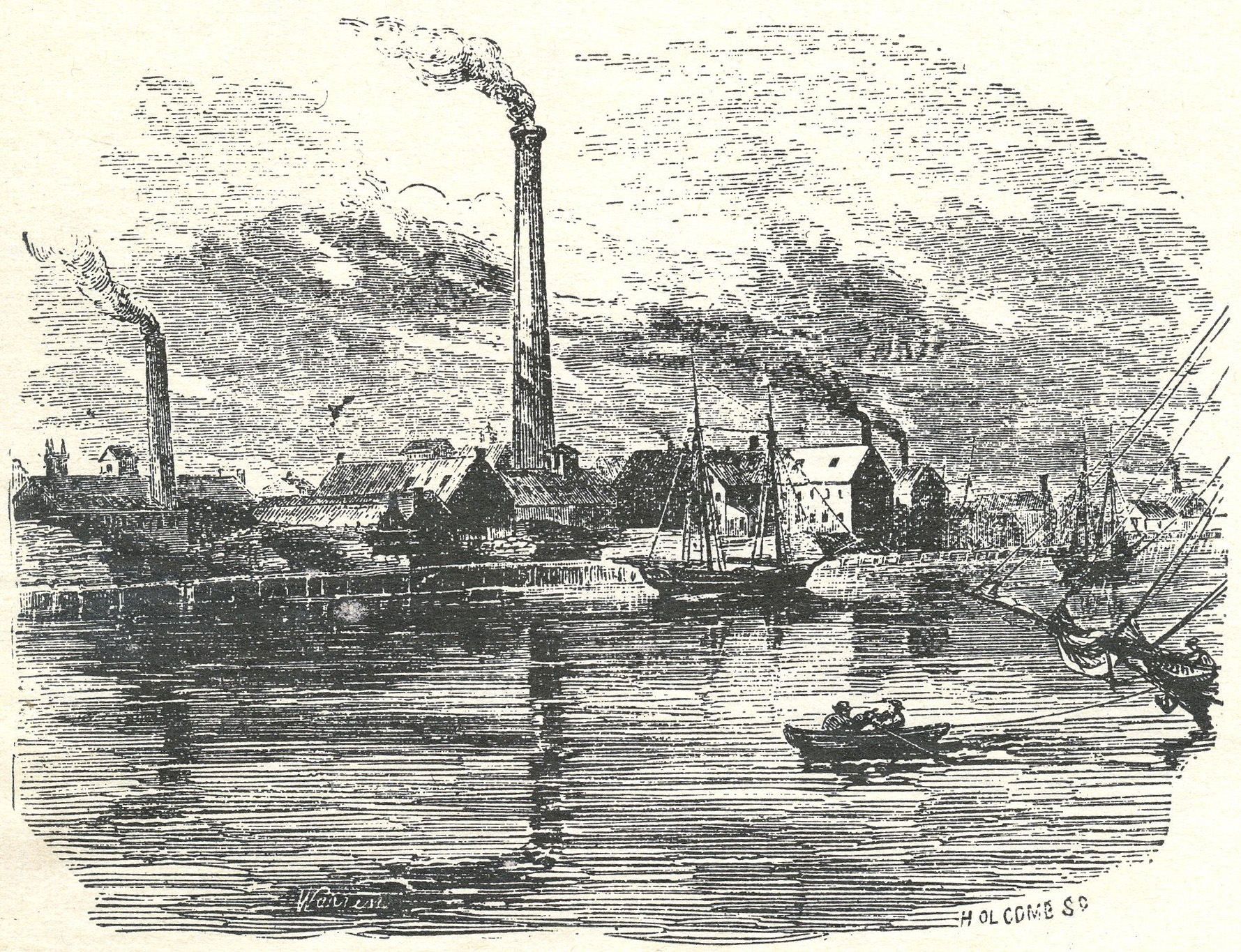
New England Glass Company 1855

Glass is made by starting with a batch of ingredients, melting it, forming the glass product, and gradually cooling it. (Note: The batch of ingredients is dominated by sand, which contains silica. Other ingredients such as soda ash, potash, and lime are added. The batch is placed inside a pot or tank that is heated by a furnace to roughly 3090 °F (1700 °C). In the glass–making industry, the melted batch is called "metal". The metal is typically shaped into the glass product (other than window glass) by either a glassblower or pressing it into a mold. The glass product must then be cooled gradually (annealed), or else it will become brittle and possibly break. An oven used for annealing is called a lehr.) In 1800, the United States had no more than ten glass factories. Most of the nation's glass products came from Europe. Lead ore, known as red lead, was a key additive for high–quality glassware, with England holding the world's known supply. (Note: Red lead was necessary to make brilliant molten glass suitable for cutting.) The United States Embargo Act of 1807, and the War of 1812, made red lead extremely difficult to acquire. After the war England kept the price of red lead high, and dumped low–priced glass products in the United States. This drove many American glass companies into bankruptcy.

One of the few successful American glass companies was the New England Glass Company, which was incorporated in 1818 and led by Deming Jarves—the "father of the American glass industry." Using assistance from the Harvard University library and a British engineer named James B. Barnes, Jarves developed a way to produce red lead from domestic sources of lead oxide. Jarves also "smuggled" European glassmaking talent to America. Among those Jarves brought in was Thomas Leighton, who rediscovered ways to make several types of colored glass, including ruby glass and mercury glass. (Note: European countries prevented glassmaking talent from coming to the United States. Venice went to the extreme measure of confining its glassmakers to the island of Murano as part of an effort to prevent the spread of glassmaking knowledge anywhere.) Jarves left his company in 1825 to form the Boston and Sandwich Glass Company.

In 1820, there were only 33 glassmaking facilities in the United States. The Tariff of 1824, which was a protective tariff, helped the American glass industry. Between 1820 and 1840, nearly 70 glass factories were started. Most of these factories were small businesses employing 25 to 40 workers. Glassmaking on the East Coast of the United States peaked around 1850, as plants shifted to Pittsburgh because of the availability of coal for fuel. By 1850, the United States had 3,237 free men above age 15 who listed their occupation as part of the glass manufacturing process. Pennsylvania accounted for 40% of the glassmaking employees. Other states with more than 100 glass workers were New Jersey, New York, Massachusetts, and Virginia.

=== Wheeling ===
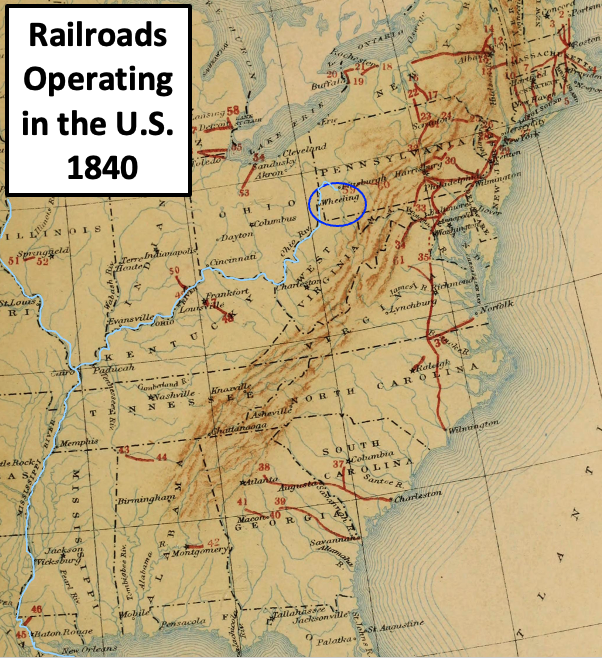
Wheeling (blue circle) and operating railroad line (in red) in 1840

Before the American Civil War, Wheeling was in the Northern Panhandle part of the Commonwealth (state) of Virginia. It was located at the intersection of the National Road with the Ohio River. Two factors made Wheeling an ideal location for a glass factory: fuel and transportation. Other than labor, fuel for the melting and annealing furnaces was the biggest expense in glassmaking. Coal was the fuel of choice for making glass during much of the 19th century, succeeding wood and eventually succeeded by natural gas and oil. Low-cost coal was available from mines close to Wheeling.

During the 1840s, waterways were usually the best mode for inter-city transportation, especially west of the Appalachian Mountains. America's railroad network was still in its infancy, and did not have much railroad line in states west of Wheeling. (Note: "The early settlements in the United States were, as a matter of necessity, made upon the seaboard. As the people moved inland they followed, as far as possible, the line of navigable water–courses." In 1845, Indiana, Illinois, Missouri, Tennessee, Kentucky, and Louisiana all had less than 50 miles (80 km) each of railroad line. Ohio and (what became) West Virginia had less than 100 miles (160 km) each.) A waterway route that used the Ohio River, and when necessary the Mississippi River, was the low–cost way to ship products from Wheeling to large cities such as Cincinnati, St. Louis, and New Orleans—and goods suffered less damage. (Note: In the 1830s, it cost less to use an all-water route through New Orleans to ship from Wheeling to New York instead of an overland route. Shipping glass over the Allegheny Mountains resulted in too much damage to the product.) In 1845, Wheeling had the transportation advantages of the Ohio River and National Road. It was already known that the Baltimore and Ohio Railroad (a.k.a. B&O) had been building railroad line to connect the city of Baltimore with the Ohio River, although there was some uncertainty about the Ohio River destination point.

==== Ritchietown and South Wheeling ====
The independent community of Ritchietown was located south of Wheeling on the Ohio River. Ritchietown was named after John Ritchie, who along with Samuel Sprigg owned much of the land in the area. Ritchie moved to the Wheeling area as early as June 1828, and was involved with real estate and Wheeling's first flint glass factory. John Ritchie's flint glass works was started in 1829. (Note: Some of the rare Ritchie glassware was on display at the Philadelphia Museum of Art during the early 1900s.) This factory was shut down in 1837. In 1839, the firm Plunkett and Miller began construction of a glassworks in Ritchietown adjacent to a hillside with coal. During that year the nation, which had just recovered from the Panic of 1837, fell into another economic depression. Plunkett and Miller began having financial difficulties, and defaulted on a mortgage in 1841. An attempt by Horatio Miller (without Plunkett) to keep the factory producing ended in late 1842 with another default, which caused the plant to be closed. In 1851, Ritchietown was incorporated, and changed its name to South Wheeling. The community changed names again in 1870, when it became part of the city of Wheeling as its Eighth Ward.

== Startup ==
In 1845, James B. Barnes and John L. Hobbs moved to the Ohio River community of Ritchietown to start a new glass company. They named their company Barnes, Hobbs and Company. James F. Barnes, son of James B. Barnes, was also a partner in the new firm. The men leased the former Plunkett and Miller glassworks, which was owned by creditors of the bankrupt firm. The glassmaking plant was called the South Wheeling Glass Works. The elder Barnes and Hobbs had worked in supervisory positions at the New England Glass Company in Massachusetts. John H. Hobbs, son of John L. Hobbs, joined the business early in its existence. A just-opened exposed seam of coal was said to "within a few rods of the furnace". Initially, coal was used to power the furnace while wood was used in the annealing process that gradually cools the product. Among the initial products were lantern chimneys (the glass surrounding the flame), jars, tumblers, and cologne bottles. At the beginning of 1848, the three partners purchased a portion of their factory's property.

=== Early years ===
The elder Mr. Barnes died in 1849. At that time, the company was reorganized as Hobbs, Barnes and Company, with the two Hobbs men and younger Barnes as the owners. In late December 1852, the B&O Railroad completed its line to Wheeling and the Ohio River, giving Wheeling access via railroad to points on the east coast. The first train between Wheeling and Baltimore ran in January 1853. More railroad lines were constructed during the following years, and the B&O Railroad eventually reached as far west as Chicago and St. Louis.

In 1854, the firm purchased the land around its factory, including land that was adjacent to the newly laid tracks of the B&O Railroad. Construction began on a new furnace. The new furnace was in response to increased demand for glassware caused by the expansion of what was, at that time, the American West. In 1856 a new partner named Jacob K. Dunham was added to the firm. The firm changed its name back to Barnes, Hobbs, and Company, and had a wholesale distribution house which was named J.K. Dunham and Company. John L. Hobbs, James F. Barnes, John H. Hobbs, and J. K. Dunham were partners in both firms.

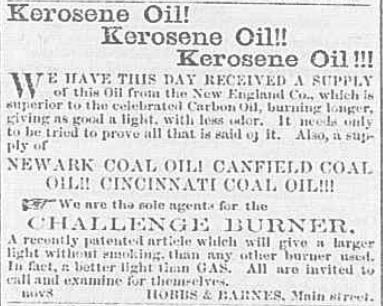
1859 advertisement for kerosene and lamps

By August 1857 the company's glassworks had three furnaces for melting batch: one ten–pot, one nine–pot, and one five–pot. (Note: Because most glass plants melted their ingredients in a pot, the plant's number of pots was often used to describe a plant's capacity. The ceramic pots were located inside the furnace. The pot contained molten glass created by melting a batch of ingredients that typically included sand, soda, lime, and other ingredients.) The plant also had an annealing furnace and stations for molds and cutting. Also mentioned was an adjoining coal mine. In 1858, Dunham withdrew from the firm, so the company changed its name to Hobbs, Barnes, and Company. During July 1859 John H. Hobbs sold his share of the company to James F. Barnes, which meant that John L. Hobbs and James F. Barnes each owned half of the company. The firm's name was then changed to Hobbs and Barnes. During 1859, petroleum was discovered in Pennsylvania. This discovery, plus the increased usage of coal oil from Kentucky, led to increased demand for kerosene lamps and lanterns. The growing popularity of petroleum–based lighting caused the company to increase production of lamps and chimneys. Demand for these products was so strong that the company could not produce enough of them.

The Hobbs and Barnes glassworks employed 115 people in 1860. The American Civil War began in 1861, and many employees of the glassworks enlisted in the Union Army. Due to the uncertain times, the furnace of the company's glassworks was shut down for about half of the year. The company continued operations, but had difficulty finding skilled workers. Elsewhere in 1862, John H. Hobbs, Hobbs and Barnes bookkeeper Charles W. Brockunier, and others formed a company that found oil in Wood County. In 1863, James F. Barnes retired, and the co-partnership of Hobbs and Barnes was dissolved. A new co-partnership was formed, consisting of John L. Hobbs, John H. Hobbs, and Charles W. Brockunier. The firm was named J. H. Hobbs, Brockunier and Company. The newest partner, Charles W. Brockunier, began working at the South Wheeling glassworks in the 1850s. It is probable that profits from the Wood County oil venture enabled Brockunier and John H. Hobbs to buy stakes in the South Wheeling glassmaking firm. The stated purpose of the new firm was "manufacturing Flint and Fancy Colored Glassware, in all its branches, at the Works, South Wheeling." The Hobbs and Barnes glassware and china outlet was also renamed. A big name change, not related to the company, occurred in June 1863—when the northwestern portion of Virginia, including Wheeling, became the state of West Virginia. The war continued to cause a labor shortage for the company, and this problem got worse during the summer of 1863 when some of the factory personnel left to form another company. This new glass company was originally named Oesterling, Henderson, and Company—and it incorporated in 1867 as Central Glass Company. By 1864, J. H. Hobbs, Brockunier and Company had only 35 to 40 workers.

== Golden era ==
Under the management J. H. Hobbs, Brockunier and Company the next twenty-five years were a golden era for the South Wheeling glassworks. The firm became "famous for the variety, quality, and beauty of its pressed ware, and the richness of its cut, engraved and blown ware". J. H. Hobbs, Brockunier & Company became "one of the most prestigious houses in the Midwest, if not in the entire country." The company made almost all types of glass products with the exception of bottles and window glass.

=== Glass formula ===
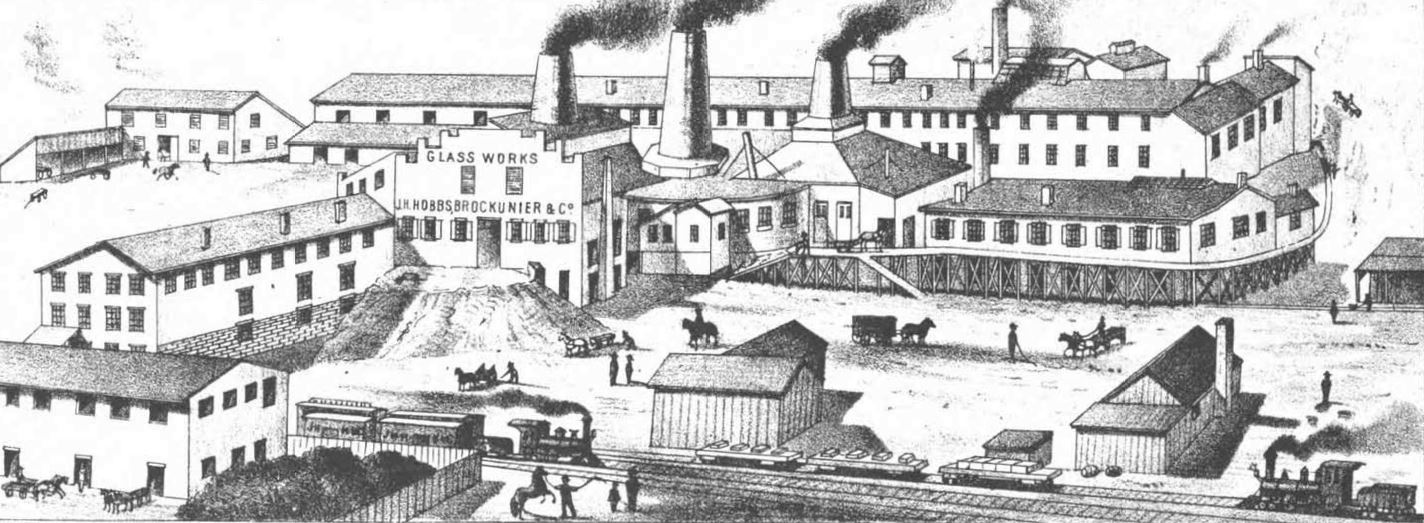
Drawing of the J.H. Hobbs, Brockunier & Co. glassworks circa 1870s

During early 1863, John L. Hobbs (the elder Hobbs) became convinced that glass made with lime instead of lead would be a better product. He began testing various combinations of ingredients to make high quality glass without lead, but his experiments were not successful. In the fall of the same year, chemist William Leighton Sr. joined the firm as a partner, and continued the experiments with lime glass. Leighton came from a glass making family, and had worked at New England Glass Company. (Note: William Leighton was the son of Thomas Leighton of the New England Glass Company, and William's five brothers all worked in the glass business.) In December 1864, Leighton had success. His major change in the formula for glass was using bicarbonate of soda instead of soda ash. His formula was similar to the long-lost soda-lime formula used many years earlier in Europe. The glass made using this formula had good enough quality that the company could compete in the high-end of the glassware market. This improvement in the formula for glass was considered one of two great advances in American glassmaking during the 19th century, the other being the invention of pressing. The ingredients used to make the glass were lower-cost than those used to make lead glass. In addition, the glass hardened faster, meaning the workforce was forced to shape or press it quicker. Thus, the new formula produced high-quality glass at lower costs for both ingredients and labor. It also inspired glassmakers to improve the processes for shaping the glass.

Leighton retired in 1868, and was replaced as a partner in the firm by his son, William Leighton Jr. The elder Leighton already made his mark on the glass industry, as his new recipe for glass caused glassware to be available to the consumer at about 25 percent of the cost prior to his discovery. The drop in prices created new demand for glass products—causing new factories to be built and old factories to increase capacity. Lime glass replaced flint glass in most households. Two other important innovations made by the company were: (1) the use of benzine in the polishing furnace, which eliminates sulfur that can cloud the glass; and (2) applying cold air to chill molds.

=== 1870s ===
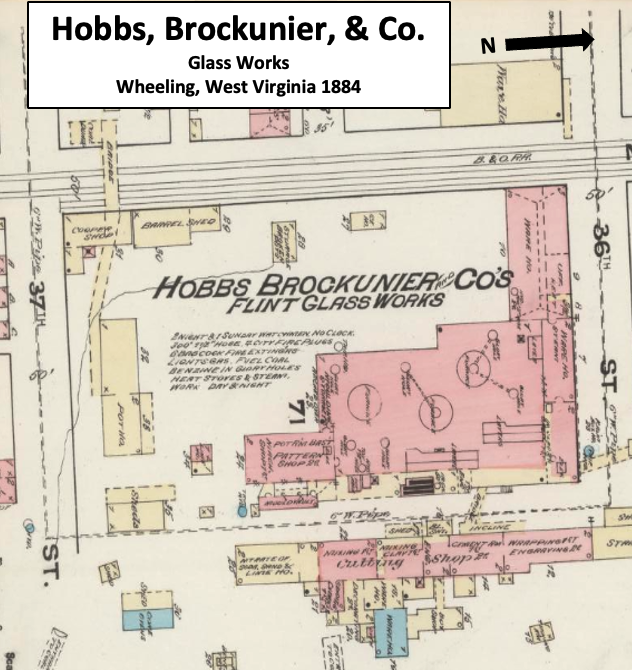
1884 insurance map of the Hobbs, Brockunier, & Co. glassworks

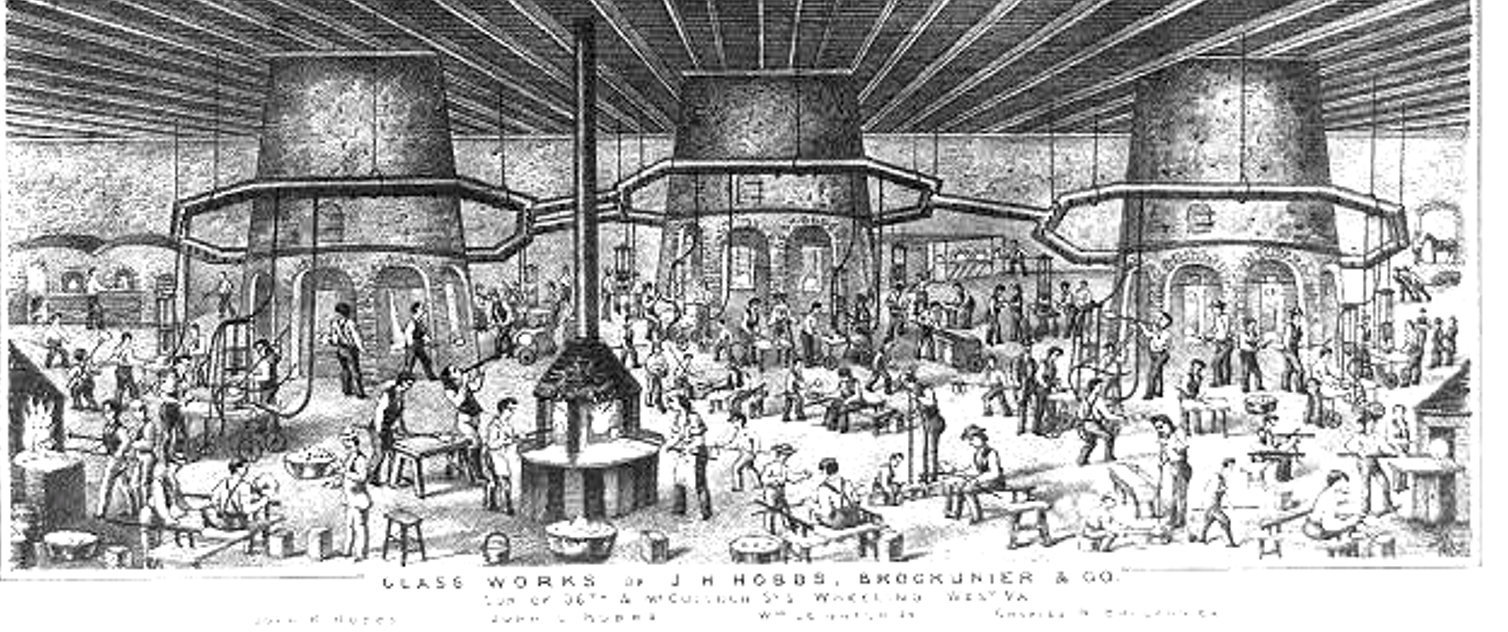
Drawing of the interior of J.H. Hobbs, Brockunier & Co. glassworks circa 1870s

By 1873 the South Wheeling Glass Works belonging to J. H. Hobbs, Brockunier and Company occupied 400 feet (121.9 m) square, and had three furnaces with a combined capacity of 29 pots. Benzine was used as a fuel for the furnace because its lack of sulfur produced clearer glass. The works employed about 300 people, and its annual revenue was about $325,000 (equivalent to $8,734,375 in 2025). An 1879 report said the glassworks occupied five acres (2.0 ha). The company had 12 departments with a total of 350 employees, and annual revenue was $300,000 (equivalent to $10,008,621 in 2025). Described as one of the most famous glassworks in the country as well as one of the largest, it was expected to be the largest after the completion of a new gas furnace.

During the decade, furnaces were rebuilt and capacity was increased to a total of 32 pots. In 1879, one furnace was converted to use gas as its fuel, and it was considered the largest furnace in the United States. About 350 people were employed at the works at that time. The company's goods were sold on four continents. Products included "all articles of glass for table use, engraved, cut and etched; bar goods, lamps, chandeliers and epergnes (ornamental centerpiece for a dining table)." J. H. Hobbs, Brockunier and Company was the largest glass company in America. Major competitors were New England Glass; Boston & Sandwich Glass; Bakewell, Pears, & Company; Mount Washington Glass, and J. B. Dobleman of Brooklyn.

=== Hobbs, Brockunier and Company ===
In 1880, 73 of the nation's 168 glass manufacturers made glassware (lead or lime glass). The average number of employees for this segment of glass manufacturers was 173, and the average annual value of output per plant was $131,076. While 1880 statistics are not readily available for J. H. Hobbs, Brockunier and Company, an 1879 article (as stated earlier) mentioned it had 350 employees and revenue of $300,000. One of the best known glassware manufacturers was Bakewell, Pears and Company; and it would close in 1882. During the 1890s, many glassware companies (possible competitors) were combined in glassware trusts, such as National Glass Company and United States Glass Company.

John L. Hobbs died in 1881, and the remaining partners purchased his stake in the firm. The company was renamed Hobbs, Brockunier and Company. In the early 1880s, the firm began making European-style glassware. By the mid-1880s, it had improved enough on the European designs that European manufacturers began emulating products from Wheeling. The glassworks was shipping about 400 railroad carloads per year to points in the United States, Cuba, South America, Australia, and Europe. Sales offices were kept in Boston, New York, Philadelphia, and Baltimore. Its colored ware was popular, and the works produced more ruby glass than the rest of the nation combined. By 1886, when including mold shops, cutting shops, etching rooms, and decorating rooms, 650 people were employed at a facility that covered several acres (1.2 ha).

== Exceptional art glass ==
=== Peachblow ===
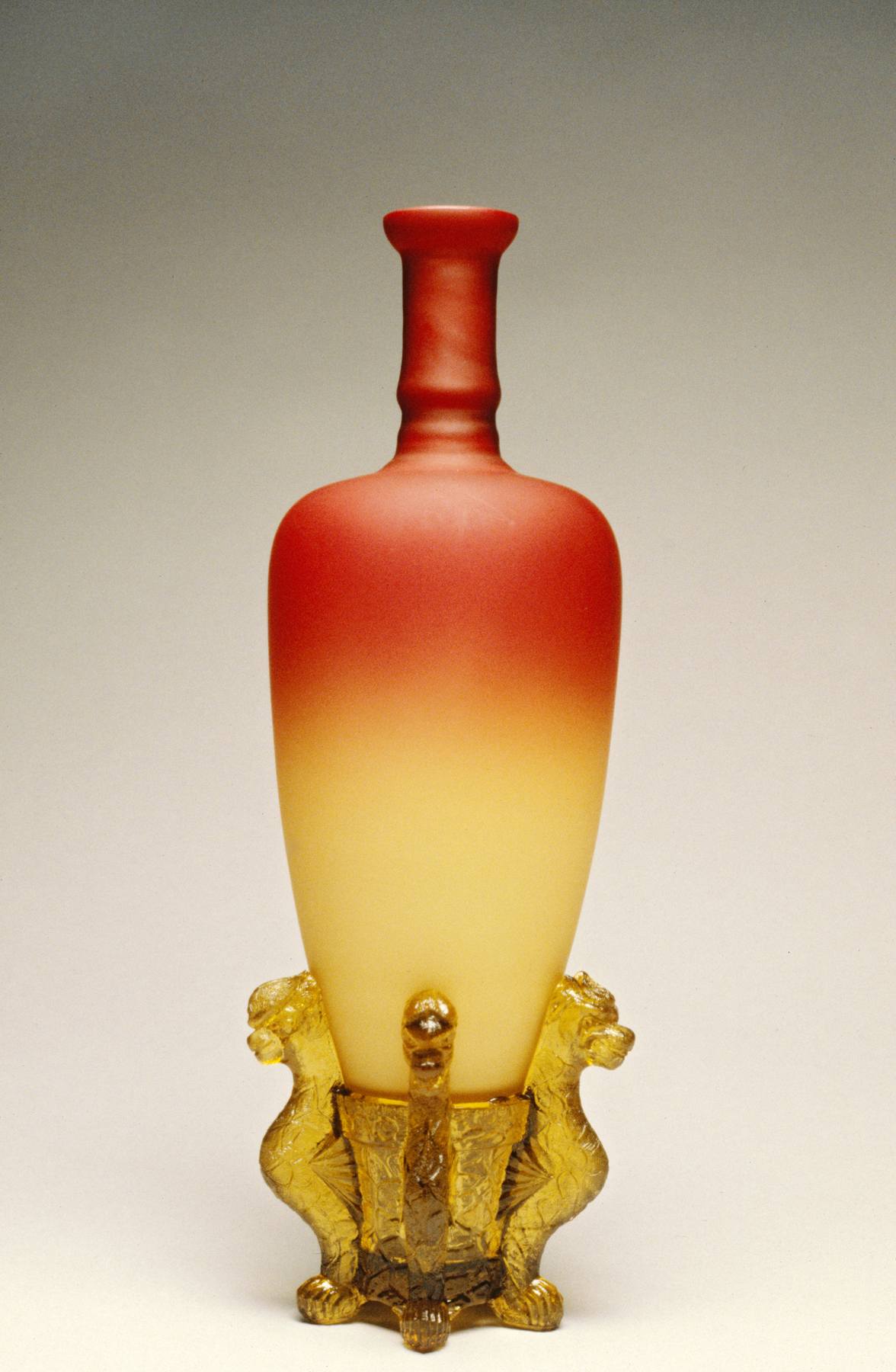
J. H. Hobbs, Brockunier & Company Peach Blow Vase, 1886, on display in the Walters Art Museum

In 1886, a Chinese porcelain vase on a stand was sold at auction for $18,000 (equivalent to $645,000 in 2025). The vase and stand were from a collection belonging to Mary Morgan, and the purchaser was William T. Walters of Baltimore. The price was extraordinary for the time, and noted in newspapers. The vase was made during the reign of the Kangxi Emperor whose reign ended in 1722. The Chinese porcelain that was popular with collectors had a two-tone glaze that was called "peachbloom". Glass companies sought to capitalize on the Morgan Vase publicity by producing products that looked similar. The glass typically used for these products is now called peachblow glass (not peachbloom), although the original product names differed. Among the rivals to Hobbs, Brockunier, and Company that made peachblow glass were New England Glass Company (Wild Rose), Thomas Webb and Sons (Peach Glass), and Stevens and Williams (Peach Bloom).

Hobbs, Brockunier and Company developed the glass used for its Morgan-style vase prior to when the Morgan Vase achieved fame, and called it "coral". The company's coral glass was said to have colors "rivaling the bloom on the peach". (Note: Another source says Hobbs, Brockunier and Company originally used the term "Wheeling Peachblow" for glass that was yellow and red with a glossy surface.) By the second half of 1886 (after the Morgan Vase sale), Hobbs, Brockunier and Company was advertising "Peach Blow Vases". Although the original Morgan Vase was placed in a wooden stand, the stand made by Hobbs, Brockunier and Company consisted of five outward facing griffins in amber–colored glass. The Hobbs, Brockunier and Company peach blow glass was white or opaque white plated with gold ruby glass. The exterior glass was reheated at the top which changed the color at the top to red. The resulting product had a white interior with an exterior that was cream-colored or yellow on the bottom half and red on the top half. The finished product had a satin or gloss finish. The same coral/peach blow glass was used for pitchers, bowls, and salt shakers.

=== Hobnail ===
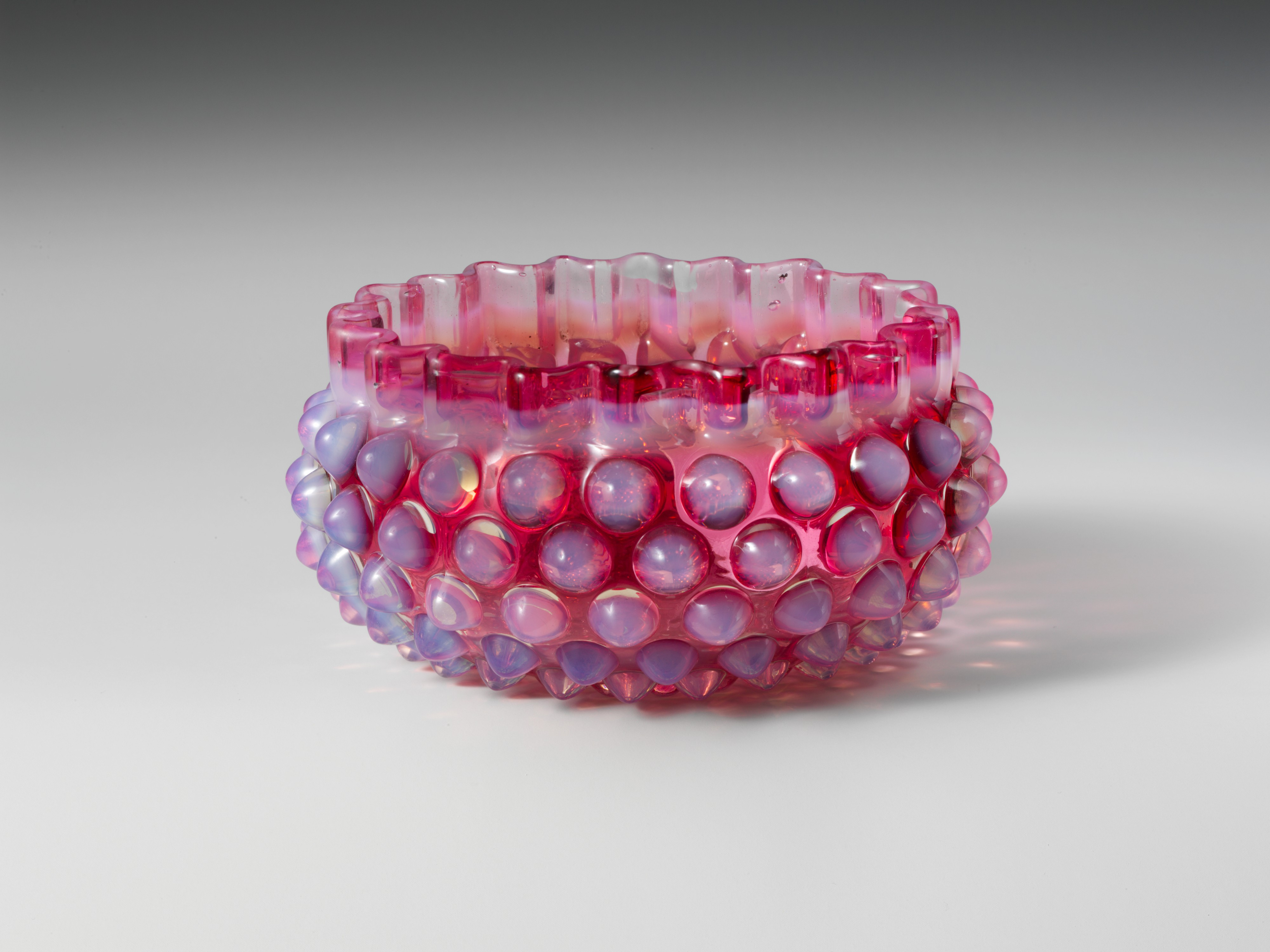
Hobnail Finger Bowl made by Hobbs Glass Company after 1886. Metropolitan Museum of Art

Hobnail glass is pressed glass with a pattern of raised bumps. It was created in 1886 at Hobbs, Brockunier and Company by William Leighton Jr. and William F. Russell. Their patent, No. 343,133, discussed projecting nodules and improvements in "pressed opalescent glassware". This style was the company's pattern 323. It was originally called Nodule, but more typically it was called Dew Drop or Pineapple. Some experts believe pattern 323 products were labeled Pineapple by the company when the ware was opalescent, and Dew Drop when the glass was not opalescent. Collectors call the pattern, and similar patterns by other companies, Hobnail or Hobnail glass.

The Dew Drop/Hobnail pattern is considered "an innovation in glass" and was very popular. It was made in at least 18 different colors, which is more than any other Hobbs' pattern. Museums such as the Corning Museum of Glass, the Metropolitan Museum of Art (New York), and a university museum all have this type of glass on display.

== Talent provider ==
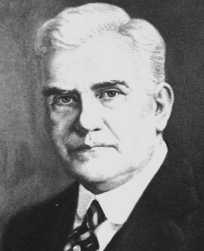
Inventor Michael J. Owens

Although the beginning of glassmaking is not known, glassmaking was conducted in ancient Egypt, Phoenicia, and Rome. Around 450 A.D. glassmaking began being concentrated in Venice, and peaked during the 17th century. Despite the efforts by the leadership of Venice to keep trade secrets by keeping glassmakers on the island of Murano, glassmaking knowledge eventually spread throughout Europe. During the 18th and early 19th centuries, glassmaking methods and recipes were still kept secret. Most European countries forbid immigration to the United States by glassworkers. The glass industry in German areas of Northern Europe went into recession during the middle of the 18th century, and that situation may have led to Germans coming to the English colonies to produce glass. In the 19th century, the various versions of the Hobbs glass works had a policy of using skilled glassworkers from Europe, who would train the local employees—resulting in a superior workforce. Former employees of the glassworks became the talent that established many of the region's glass factories, and many were company presidents or plant managers.

Perhaps the one former Hobbs employee that had the biggest influence on the industry in addition to Leighton was Michael Owens. Owens began working at J. H. Hobbs, Brockunier and Company at the age of 10. After joining Edward Libbey's glassworks at the age of 29, Owens revolutionized the glass bottle industry by inventing a machine that would make bottles at high speed and low cost with consistency in size and shape. Not only did Owens' invention lower costs, it also opened new markets where low cost bottles with consistent size could be used as containers for products that previously had limited distribution. Owens was also involved with improving a process that used a machine for making window glass, which changed the way window glass was produced. To accomplish the change in window glassmaking, Owens hired Irving Wightman Colburn after purchasing his patents involved with the new process. Together (and with adequate funding) the two men refined Colburn's process. The Colburn process, along with the European Fourcault process developed separately at the same time, changed the way window glass was made. At one time Owens was part of a group of five men that controlled the Toledo Glass Company, the Owens Bottle Company, and Libbey–Owens Sheet Company—and indirectly controlled Libbey Glass Company.

During the 1860s, at least two glass companies were formed or led by former J. H. Hobbs, Brockunier and Company (or earlier versions of the company) employees. Those companies were the Belmont Glass Company and Oesterling, Henderson, and Company (later renamed Central Glass Company). In the 1870s, former employees started the Bellaire Goblet Company and Riverside Glass Company. In the 1880s, in addition to companies started by Owens, the Hazel Glass Company, Fostoria Glass Company, and Dalzell, Gilmore and Leighton Company were formed. Additional 1880s companies were the Nickel Plate Glass Company and C.H. Over Glass Company. The Fostoria Shade and Lamp Company, Novelty Glass Company, and Seneca Glass Company were started in the 1890s. Sneath Glass Company and Robinson Glass Company were also started by former employees of the various Hobbs companies in the 1890s. During the first decade of the 20th century, Kopp Glass Company, Bonita Art Glass Company, and H. Northwood and Company were started. Among former Hobbs employees involved with these companies were: Charles N. Brady, William S. Brady, Peter Cassell, Henry Crimmel, Benjamin M. Hildreth, Otto Jaeger, Nicholas Kopp Jr., William Leighton Jr., Lucian B. Martin, Harry Northwood, John Oesterling, Charles Henry Over, John Robinson, James B. Russell, and others.

== Decline ==
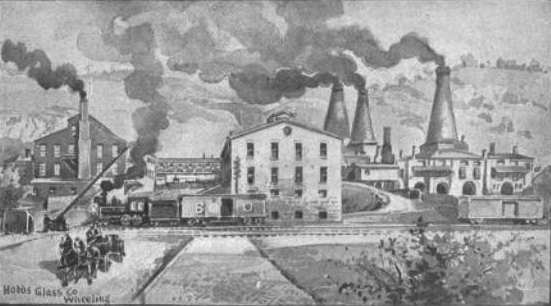
Drawing of the Wheeling glassworks of Hobbs Glass Company in 1888

The charter for Hobbs, Brockunier and Company expired at the end of 1887—about the same time as the young workers at the plant went on strike, causing a shutdown. Several key people left the company, and it was difficult to find investors for a new charter. Although Brockunier and Leighton continued to be investors, Brockunier retired for health reasons and Leighton became involved with a glass company in Findlay, Ohio. William Russell left for Findlay in 1888 to become factory manager.

A new version of the firm was formed in August 1888 and the factory was restarted. The newly incorporated company was named Hobbs Glass Company, and major stockholders included John H. Hobbs, William Leighton Jr., Henry Schmulback, A.J. Clark, and Howard Hazlett. Stockholders elected John H. Hobbs president. Nicholas Kopp became the chemist (replacing Leighton), and he was described as head of the plant by the end of 1889. Kopp was internationally known for his skill with colored glass and design work. A fire damaged the facility in October 1890, causing $30,000 (equivalent to $1,075,000 in 2025) in damages.

=== U.S. Glass ===
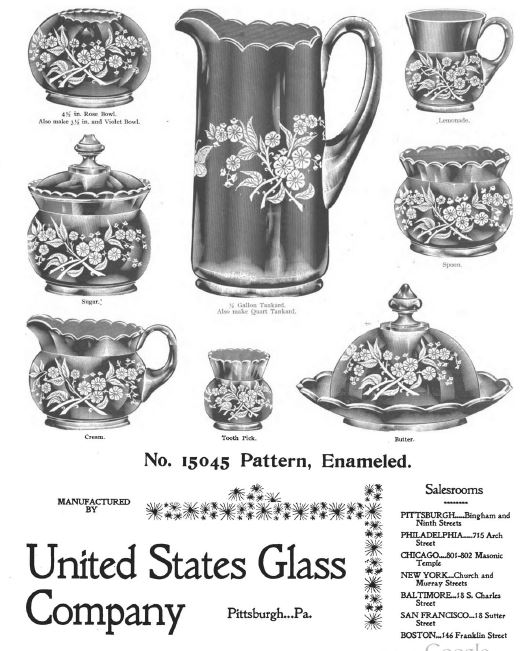
Advertisement for glassware made by the United States Glass Company.

In February 1891, a glass trust was formed in Harrisburg, Pennsylvania. The new firm was named United States Glass Company, and John H. Hobbs was on the board of directors. Initially, the Pittsburgh-based company consisted of 16 unionized glassworks. Each factory became known by a letter (e.g. Factory A of United States Glass Company). Hobbs Glass Company became Factory H, and more key talent immediately left the company, including Kopp. The United States was in an economic recession at the time of the formation of the glass trust. More recessions would occur during the 1890s, and 1893 is considered the beginning of an economic depression with deflation and a high unemployment rate. Two ways to make the plants produce products at lower prices were to get concessions from the unions and to introduce more machines. It is the opinion of some experts that the U.S. Glass trust was formed to "oppose the union and to introduce the automated equipment." The American Flint Glass Workers' Union was naturally opposed to mechanization or concessions, and it was strong enough that a single glassworks could not oppose it. U.S. Glass preferred to produce glass using the most modern equipment with relatively unskilled workers. This meant that complicated glass products that had been produced by skilled workers such as Kopp and Leighton would be phased out.

Within the next year, representatives of the trust evaluated the 16 glassworks. Factory H was thought to be old, have high expenses, and produce products that were costly to make. In addition, the process for making many of Factory H's products could not be easily mechanized. U.S. Glass built large new glassworks at Gas City, Indiana, and Glassport, Pennsylvania. The new plants were highly automated—and could oppose unions at the other 16 plants. During the summer of 1892, workers at Factory H were notified that after the summer shutdown, their jobs would be vacant. Those that desired to work at the plant would need to apply to the new factory manager. On October 12, 1893, the American Flint Glass Workers began a strike. Glass was not produced at Factory H, although inventory was still being sold. In January 1894 U.S. Glass proposed that if the workers at its Wheeling plants would accept the terms of the labor agreements used in its Pittsburgh plants, work would start immediately. If the conditions were not accepted, then Wheeling's two glassworks (Factory H and Factory O) would be torn down. The union rejected the proposed terms. Members of the union remained on strike until 1897. U.S. Glass survived by producing glass at its two large (and recently built) highly mechanized plants.

=== Northwood ===
Factory H was not torn down, and U.S. Glass was still maintaining the facility in early 1895. In 1902, the plant was sold to Harry Northwood. Northwood was an Englishman that worked at Hobbs, Brockunier and Company as an etcher in the 1880s. The company showcased his work at the West Virginia State Fair in 1882, which included etched pitchers and wine glasses. Northwood was considered "one of the leading glassmen of this country". His new glassworks was H. Northwood and Company. The plant employed 300 people, and became well known for table ware. Northwood died in 1919, and his company closed in 1925. That was the end of glassmaking at the Wheeling glassworks originally known as Barnes, Hobbs, and Company; and more famous as J. H. Hobbs, Brockunier, and Company.

== Notes ==
=== References ===
- Baker, Gary E. (June 1986). The Flint Glass Industry in Wheeling, West Virginia: 1829–1865 (MA). University of Delaware. Archived from the original on 2023-07-12.
- Bredehoft, Neila M.; Bredehoft, Thomas H. (1997). Hobbs, Brockunier and Co., Glass: Identification and Value Guide. Paducah, KY: Collector Books. ISBN 978-0-89145-780-0. OCLC 37340501.
- Dyer, Davis; Gross, Daniel (2001). The Generations of Corning: The Life and Times of a Global Corporation. Oxford: Oxford University Press. ISBN 978-0-19514-095-8. OCLC 45437326.
- Knittle, Rhea Mansfield (1927). Early American Glass. New York City: The Century Co. ISBN 9781404753853. OCLC 1811743. Archived from the original on 2023-07-19.
- Lechner, Mildred; Lechner, Ralph (1998). The World of Salt Shakers: Antique & Art Glass Value Guide Volume III. Paducah, Kentucky: Collector Books. ISBN 978-1-57432-065-7. OCLC 39502285.
- Madarasz, Anne; Historical Society of Western Pennsylvania; Senator John Heinz Pittsburgh Regional History Center (1998). Glass: Shattering Notions. Pittsburgh, Pennsylvania: Historical Society of Western Pennsylvania. ISBN 978-0-93634-001-2. OCLC 39921461.
- Metropolitan Museum of Art (New York); Johnson, Marilynn; Schwartz, Marvin D.; Boorsch, Suzanne (1970). 19th-century America: Furniture and Other Decorative Arts; An Exhibition in Celebration of the Hundredth Anniversary of the Metropolitan Museum of Art, April 16 through September 7, 1970. New York City: Museum, Distributed by New York Graphic Society. ISBN 978-0-87099-004-5. OCLC 461476151.
- Newton, J. H.; Nichols, G. G.; Sprankle, A. G. (1879). History of the Pan-handle: Being Historical Collections of the Counties of Ohio, Brooke, Marshall and Hancock, West Virginia. Wheeling, West Virginia: J.A. Caldwell. ISBN 978-1-55613-413-5. OCLC 12537018. Archived from the original on 2023-07-25.
- Palmer, Arlene (1976). "Glass Production in Eighteenth-Century America: The Wistarburgh Enterprise". Winterthur Portfolio. 11. Chicago, Illinois: University of Chicago Press on behalf of the Henry Francis du Pont Winterthur Museum Inc.: 75–101. doi:10.1086/495842. JSTOR 1180591. S2CID 161635810. Archived from the original on November 17, 2023.
- Paquette, Jack K. (2002). Blowpipes, Northwest Ohio Glassmaking in the Gas Boom of the 1880s. Xlibris Corp. ISBN 1-4010-4790-4. OCLC 50932436.
- Poor, Henry V. (1868). Poor's Manual of Railroads for 1868–69. New York City: H.V. & H.W. Poor. OCLC 5585553. Archived from the original on May 21, 2023.
- Scoville, Warren C. (September 1944). "Growth of the American Glass Industry to 1880". Journal of Political Economy. 52 (3): 193–216. doi:10.1086/256182. JSTOR 1826160. S2CID 154003064. Archived from the original on November 13, 2023.
- Shotwell, David J. (2002). Glass A to Z. Iola, Wisconsin: Krause Publications. ISBN 978-0-87349-385-7. OCLC 440702171.
- Skrabec, Quentin R. (2007). Michael Owens and the Glass Industry. Gretna, Louisiana: Pelican Publishing. OCLC 137341537.
- Skrabec, Quentin R. (2011). Edward Drummond Libbey, American glassmaker. Jefferson, NC: McFarland. ISBN 978-0-7864-8548-2. OCLC 753968484.
- United States (1853). The Seventh Census of the United States, 1850: Embracing a Statistical View of Each of the States and Territories, Arranged by Counties, Towns, Etc. ... Washington, District of Columbia: R. Armstrong. OCLC 1049765701. Archived from the original on July 7, 2023.
- United States (1901). Report of the Industrial Commission on the Relations and Conditions of Capital and Labor Employed in Manufactures and General Business, including testimony so far as taken November 1, 1900, and digest of testimony. (Volume 7). Washington, District of Columbia: Government Printing Office. OCLC 3888071.
- United States Department of Commerce, Bureau of Foreign and Domestic Commerce (1917). The Glass Industry. Report on the Cost of Production of Glass in the United States. Washington: Government Printing Office. OCLC 5705310.
- (Unknown) (1879). The Industries of Wheeling. Historical, Descriptive and Biographical Review of the Commercial and Manufacturing Advantages of Wheeling, Bellaire, Ohio, Martin's Ferry, Ohio, &c (Library of Congress). Wheeling, West Virginia: Land & Brown. OCLC 5655586. Archived from the original on July 4, 2023.
- Venable, Charles L.; Jenkins, Tom; Denker, Ellen P.; Grier, Katherine C.; Harrison, Stephen G. (2000). China and Glass in America, 1880–1980: from Tabletop to TV Tray. Dallas: Dallas Museum of Art. ISBN 978-0-81096-692-5. OCLC 905439701.
- Weeks, Joseph D.; United States Census Office (1884). Report on the Manufacture of Glass. Washington, District of Columbia: U.S. Government Printing Office. OCLC 2123984. Archived from the original on July 16, 2023.
