= Fostoria Shade and Lamp Company =

Glass lamp company

- Type: Private company
- Industry: Glassware
- Founded: 1890
- Founder: W. C. Brown, James B. Graham
- Defunct: 1893
- Successor: Consolidated Lamp and Glass Company
- Headquarters: Fostoria, Ohio, U.S.
- Key people: Nicholas Kopp Jr.
- Products: lamps; novelties
- Number of employees: 250 (December 1893)

The Fostoria Shade and Lamp Company was the largest manufacturer of glass lamps in the United States during the early 1890s. It began operations in Fostoria, Ohio, on May 17, 1890. The plant was run by Nicholas Kopp Jr., a former chemist at Hobbs, Brockunier and Company in West Virginia. Kopp achieved fame for his many glass designs and formulas for various colors of glass, and he is the discoverer of the American formula for selenium-based ruby glass. The company's products were very popular, and it was able to make significant profits early in its existence. In addition to lamps and shades for home lighting, the company also made novelties such as salt shakers.

The nationwide depression known as the Panic of 1893 began in January 1893, and company president and politician Charles Foster filed for personal bankruptcy a few months later. The company merged with the Pittsburgh-based company Wallace & McAfee near the end of 1893, and the combined company was called Consolidated Lamp and Glass Company. Operations continued at the Fostoria glass works after it was officially taken over by the new company on January 1, 1894. The Fostoria plant was mostly shut down by December 1895, and a new Pennsylvania glass works began operations on March 16, 1896. Consolidated Lamp and Glass operated until 1964.

== Background ==
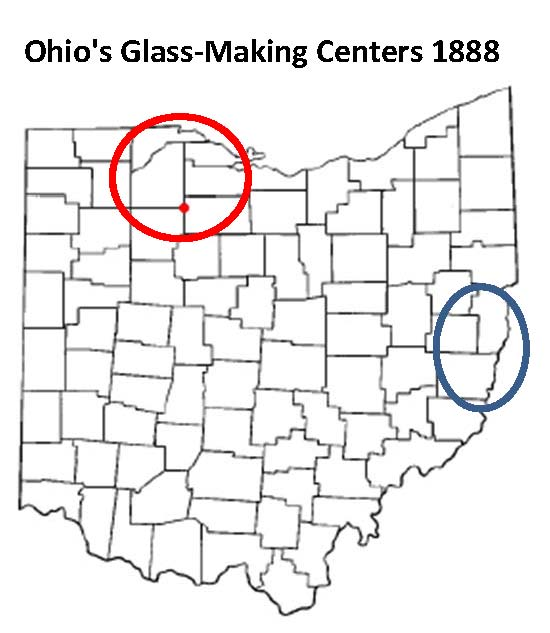
Old glass making center circled in blue, new in red (dot marks Fostoria)

=== Glassmaking ===
Glass is made by starting with a batch of ingredients, melting it, forming the glass product, and gradually cooling it. The batch of ingredients is dominated by sand, which contains silica. Other ingredients such as soda ash, potash, and lime are added. The batch is placed inside a pot or tank that is heated by a furnace to roughly 3090 °F (1700 °C). In the glass–making industry, the melted batch is called "metal". The metal is typically shaped into the glass product (other than window glass) by glassblowing or pressing it into a mold. The glass product must then be cooled gradually (annealed), or it will break. An oven used for annealing is called a lehr. Because most glass plants melted their ingredients in a pot during the 1880s, a plant's number of pots was often used to describe capacity. A major expense for glass factories is fuel for the furnace. Wood and coal had long been used as fuel for glassmaking. An alternative fuel, natural gas, became a desirable fuel for making glass because it is clean, gives a uniform heat, and is easier to control. In the United States, gas and oil began replacing coal as a fuel for glassmaking in the 1870s—where it was available.

=== Ohio gas boom ===
In the 1870s, Ohio had a glass industry located principally in the eastern portion of the state, especially in coal-rich Belmont County. The Belmont County community of Bellaire, located on the Ohio side of the Ohio River across from Wheeling, West Virginia, was known as "Glass City" from 1870 to 1885. In early 1886, a major discovery of natural gas (the Karg Well) occurred in northwest Ohio near the small village of Findlay. Communities in northwestern Ohio began using low-cost natural gas along with free land and cash to entice glass companies to start operations in their towns. Their efforts were successful, and at least 70 glass factories existed in northwest Ohio between 1886 and the early 20th century. The city of Fostoria was a desirable location for manufacturing because it was already served by multiple railroad lines. It was close enough to the natural gas field that it could use a pipeline to make natural gas available to businesses in town. Eventually, Fostoria had 13 different glass companies at various times between 1887 and 1920. (Note: The count of Fostoria glass companies varies depending on how restarts and reorganizations are counted. The Fostoria Ohio Glass Association lists 13 companies for 1887–1920. Paquette discusses 15 companies plus four post-boom companies in Chapter V of his Blowpipes book.) Ohio's gas boom enabled it to improve its national ranking as a manufacturer of glass from 4th in 1880 to 2nd in 1890.

=== Lamps in the 1890s ===
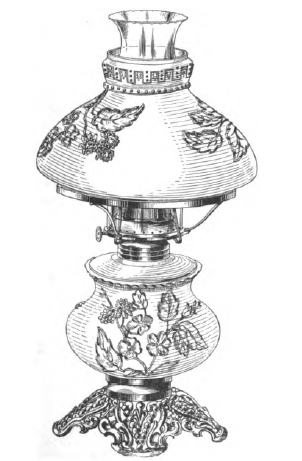
1890s lamp (not FS&L)

In 1859, petroleum was discovered in Pennsylvania. This discovery, plus the increased usage of coal oil from Kentucky, led to increased demand for kerosene lamps and lanterns. During the 1860s, the major glass factory in West Virginia could not produce enough lamps to meet demand. Kerosine lamps were used in the home for lighting, since electric lighting was only beginning in the late 1800s. Demand for kerosine lamps would continue for decades. By 1920 electricity reached only 35 percent of homes in the United States.

Lamps from the 1890s consisted of a stand, font, chimney, and often a shade. The font (also spelled "fount") held the kerosine for the lamp. The chimney was a glass tube placed around the lamp's flame that had a bulge at the base that kept drafts away from the flame and added extra illumination. A lamp's shade was a glass object that surrounded the light source and diffused it.

== A new glass factory ==
=== Beginning ===
On November 9, 1889, Fostoria's Buttler Art Glass Company lost its glass works to a fire that was described as "most disastrous that ever occurred in Fostoria". The plant had employed about 180 people, and was only partially insured. A major problem for the glass works was that the site did not have a good connection to city water, making it difficult for firefighters to fight fires. Among the major Buttler stockholders were James B. Graham and Colonel Wilbur C. Brown, who were from Pittsburgh and Fostoria, respectively. Another Fostoria investor was the former governor of Ohio, Charles Foster. In January 1890 the shareholders of Buttler Art Glass decided that it would be too costly to rebuild.

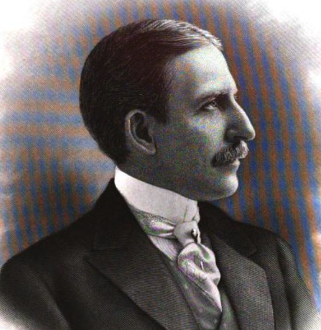
Wilbur C. Brown

On February 6, Colonel Brown made public a plan that if he could get enough funding, he would start a bigger and better glass works. Less than a week later, Brown announced that he, Graham, and other Buttler Art Glass investors would build a factory to manufacture colored shades, lamps, and novelties. Nicholas Kopp Jr was hired as plant superintendent, who had been working as the chemist at Hobbs Glass Company in Wheeling, West Virginia. (Note: The J.H. Hobbs, Brockunier and Company was reorganized with name changes multiple times over a period of about 50 years. Each version of the company name included "Hobbs".) One historian notes that Kopp's father was already working in Fostoria at the Fostoria Glass Company, and Charles Foster was on that firm's board of directors in addition to being involved with the new Fostoria Lamp and Shade Company.

The Buttler Art Glass site was offered for sale on February 20 and eventually sold to another group of investors (including Foster) that formed the Novelty Glass Company. (Note: The water issue would become a problem again in 1893 for the owners of the Novelty Glass Company when their facility, built on the same site as the Buttler Art Glass Company works, was destroyed by fire.) Despite the news releases about the new glass works, the Fostoria Shade and Lamp Company was not formally organized until after it was announced that Kopp was hired. Brown and Graham's new company was formally organized in early March and named Fostoria Shade and Lamp Company. Among members of the board of directors were Graham and Brown. Foster became president, and William S. Brady was vice president. (Note: Murray cites the organization of Fostoria Shade and Lamp Company from the May 13, 1890, edition of the Crockery & Glass Journal.) Brady had held leadership positions at J. H. Hobbs, Brockunier and Company, Riverside Glass Company, and temporarily held leadership positions at both Fostoria Glass Company and Fostoria Shade and Lamp Company. Graham was secretary–treasurer.

=== Operations ===
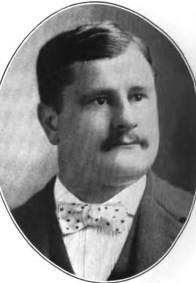
Nicholas Kopp Jr

The new factory was located in the Hancock County section of Fostoria near the tracks of the Nickel Plate Railroad. The plan was to have one 10-pot furnace, two lehrs, and small ovens for decorating and molds. Fuel would be natural gas. (Note: The 1890 Annual Report of the Geological Survey of Ohio lists the fuel for the new company as natural gas with furnace of 16 pots. This differs in size from the 10-pot natural gas furnace cited by Paquette, who used the Fostoria Review as his source.) The factory was completed close to the projected date, and production started on May 17, 1890. By August, one journal reported that the company's beautiful pressed lamps were selling "like hot cakes". (Note: Murray cites the August 21, 1890, edition of the National Glass Budget for the August lamp sales information. Paquette agrees with the "hot cakes" quote, writing that it can be found on page 2 of National Glass Budget.) A year later in 1891, the plant was reported to have 250 workers and working three shifts per day. Kopp was born in Alsace–Lorraine, and could speak German and French along with English. Many of Fostoria's skilled glassworkers were from Austria, Belgium, and France. Local lore, unproven, holds that Kopp divided his factory's three shifts into German–speaking, French–speaking, and English–speaking groups.

By the summer of 1892, a report in a trade journal mentioned the company's wide variety of colors, shapes, sizes, and styles for lamps—and was also complimentary of the lamp shades. (Note: Paquette cites the July 27, 1892, edition of China, Glass & Lamps for the description of lamps and shades.) The Fostoria Shade and Lamp company was the largest manufacturer of lamp shades in the United States. In November, concern over a tariff caused wholesalers and resellers to pause buying glassware, forcing manufacturers to put employees on half time so the company would not be overloaded with unsold products.

=== Unusual patterns ===
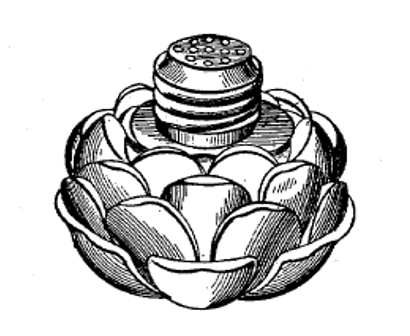
Kopp-designed shaker that looks like a rose

As the largest lamp producer in the United States, Fostoria Shade and Lamp Company had numerous colorful products that were very popular. It was Kopp's skills in design and color that enabled the company to achieve a position of international renown. Among products made that were not lamps or shades were salt and pepper shakers. Kopp received a patent on March 10, 1891, for a salt shaker design that looked like a rose. The patent calls the design "Closed Vessel with Perforated Cover", and Kopp applied for the patent on January 24, 1891. A publication released in 1998 valued a rare pair of these rose shakers, with a holder, at $710 to $730 (equivalent to $1,422 in 2025).

In 1892, Fostoria Shade and Lamp produced a lamp shaped like Santa Claus. The May 25, 1892, edition of Crockery & Glass Journal mentioned strong demand for the company's night lamps, and mentioned a new Santa Claus lamp that is "neat and novel". In the November 3, 1892 edition of the same journal the company's novelties were described as having strong demand, and the Santa Claus lamp was an "emphatic hit". The same journal again mentioned the Santa Claus lamp in its November 17, 1892, edition, where it described the night lamp for the holidays as one that "ought surely to prove attractive to buyers". Originally, this lamp sold for $4 (equivalent to $143 in 2025) per dozen. By 1988, collectors were willing to pay a four figure amount for one.

=== Depression ===
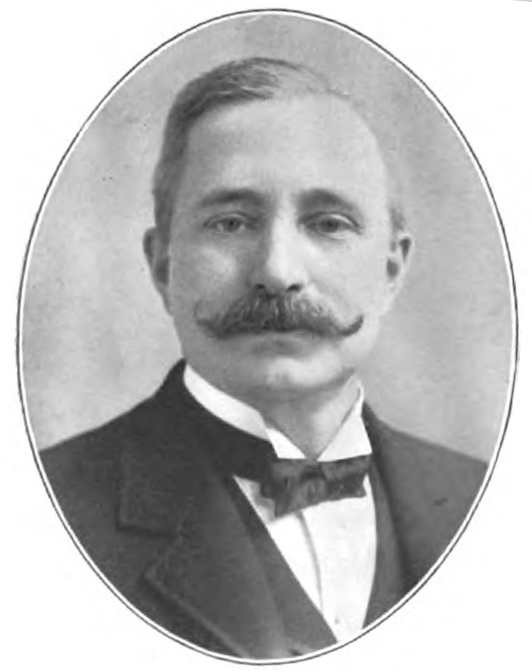
Frank G. Wallace

An economic depression began in January 1893, becoming known as the Panic of 1893. Fostoria Shade and Lamp Company had done well enough in 1892 that it declared a cash dividend in the spring of 1893. Charles Foster completed his term as United States Secretary of the Treasury, and was re-elected president of Fostoria Shade and Lamp Company. (Note: Although Murray says Foster was re-elected, a newspaper claimed that James B. Graham was president of the company in November 1892.) In May the nation was shocked when Foster declared bankruptcy. Three window glass companies that Foster had invested in (Mambourg Glass Company, Crocker Glass Company, and Calcine Glass Company) shut down and some banks and non-glass companies were also affected.

Fostoria Shade and Lamp Company was a successful internationally known style leader for glass lamps, yet it had the bankruptcies in other businesses in Fostoria that were perhaps scaring creditors. The company caught the attention of businessmen Frank G. Wallace and Hugh W. McAfee. These men owned Wallace & McAfee, Limited, which was a glassware distributor in Pittsburgh. In November, they began negotiations to purchase Fostoria Shade and Lamp Company, which they would merge with their firm to form a new company called Consolidated Lamp and Glass Company. The new company would be headquartered in Pittsburgh, with Wallace as president and Graham (from Fostoria Lamp and Glass) secretary. The sale of the largest manufacturer of lamps and shades in the United States was official on December 13, 1893. (Note: Murray cites the December 13, 1893, edition of China, Glass & Lamps for the sale and factory size information.)

=== Consolidated Lamp and Glass Company ===
The Fostoria Shade and Lamp glass works had 250 employees in December 1893. Consolidated Lamp and Glass Company officially took possession of the Fostoria glass works on January 1, 1894. Production would continue in Fostoria, while warehouses would be in Pittsburgh. According to a notice in a Pittsburgh newspaper, Wallace & McAfee Company, Limited, was not officially dissolved until June 25, 1894. A notable achievement occurred in 1894, when Nicholas Kopp developed a formula for making ruby (deep red) glass using selenium instead of gold. The works in Fostoria continued to operate until near the end of December 1895. At that time the plant was shut down so the company could move its equipment to Coraopolis, Pennsylvania, near Pittsburgh. The new Pennsylvania plant made a partial start in March 1896, and a full force started on the following week. Kopp eventually left the company and started the Kopp Lamp and Glass Company in 1900, with operations starting in 1901. The Corapolis works of Consolidated Lamp and Glass Company operated until 1964.

== Notes ==
=== References ===
- Baker, Gary E. (June 1986). The Flint Glass Industry in Wheeling, West Virginia: 1829–1865 (MA). University of Delaware. Archived from the original on 2023-07-12.
- Bredehoft, Neila M.; Bredehoft, Thomas H. (1997). Hobbs, Brockunier and Co., Glass: Identification and Value Guide. Paducah, KY: Collector Books. ISBN 978-0-89145-780-0. OCLC 37340501.
- Consolidated Lamp and Glass Company (April 1896). "As Others See Us (advertisement)". Glass and Pottery World. IV (4). Chicago, Illinois: American Glass and Pottery World Company: 36. Archived from the original on March 1, 2024.
- Geological Survey of Ohio (1890). Annual Report of the Geological Survey of Ohio. Columbus, Ohio: Westbote Co., State Printers. OCLC 13585464. Archived from the original on August 3, 2023.
- Lechner, Mildred; Lechner, Ralph (1998). The World of Salt Shakers: Antique & Art Glass Value Guide Volume III. Paducah, Kentucky: Collector Books. ISBN 978-1-57432-065-7. OCLC 39502285.
- McKelvey, Alexander T. (1903). Centennial History of Belmont county, Ohio and Representative Citizens. Chicago: Biographical Publishing Company. OCLC 318390043. "Centennial history of belmont county."
- Murray, Melvin L. (1992). Fostoria, Ohio Glass II. Fostoria, OH: M. L. Murray. OCLC 27036061.
- Newton, J. H.; Nichols, G. G.; Sprankle, A. G. (1879). History of the Pan-handle: Being Historical Collections of the Counties of Ohio, Brooke, Marshall and Hancock, West Virginia. Wheeling, West Virginia: J.A. Caldwell. ISBN 978-1-55613-413-5. OCLC 12537018. Archived from the original on 2023-07-25.
- Paquette, Jack K. (2002). Blowpipes, Northwest Ohio Glassmaking in the Gas Boom of the 1880s. Xlibris Corp. ISBN 1-4010-4790-4. OCLC 50932436.
- Shively, R.R. (September 1924). "Principles of Glass Making – Use of Selenium in Glass". The Ceramist. 4 (6). Newark, New Jersey: Ceramics Publishing Company: 371–374. Archived from the original on January 24, 2024.
- Shotwell, David J. (2002). Glass A to Z. Iola, Wisconsin: Krause Publications. ISBN 978-0-87349-385-7. OCLC 440702171.
- Skrabec, Quentin R. (2007). Michael Owens and the Glass Industry. Gretna, Louisiana: Pelican Publishing. OCLC 137341537.
- Tillotson, E. Ward (December 1920). "Modern Glass-Making – Putting the Glass Industry on a Scientific Basis". Scientific American Monthly. II (4). New York City: Scientific American Publishing Company: 351–354. Archived from the original on November 17, 2023.
- United States Census Office (1895). Report on manufacturing industries in the United States at the eleventh census: 1890. Washington: Government Printing Office. OCLC 10470409.
- United States Department of Commerce, Bureau of Foreign and Domestic Commerce (1917). The Glass Industry. Report on the Cost of Production of Glass in the United States. Washington: Government Printing Office. OCLC 5705310.
- Weeks, Joseph D.; United States Census Office (1884). Report on the Manufacture of Glass. Washington, District of Columbia: U.S. Government Printing Office. OCLC 2123984. Archived from the original on July 16, 2023.
- Weiser, Paulette J.; Findlay-Hancock County Chamber of Commerce (Ohio) (2007). Historic Hancock County: An Illustrated History. San Antonio, Texas: Historical Publishing Network. OCLC 1391569311.
- Woolf, Arthur G. (April 1987). "The Residential Adoption of Electricity in Early Twentieth-Century America". The Energy Journal. 8 (2). Woodmere, Ohio: International Association for Energy Economics: 19–30. doi:10.5547/ISSN0195-6574-EJ-Vol8-No2-2. JSTOR 41322257. S2CID 154792898. Archived from the original on August 21, 2023.
