= Wellington-Harrington =

Neighborhood in Cambridge, Massachusetts

Coordinates: 42°22′21″N 71°5′31″W

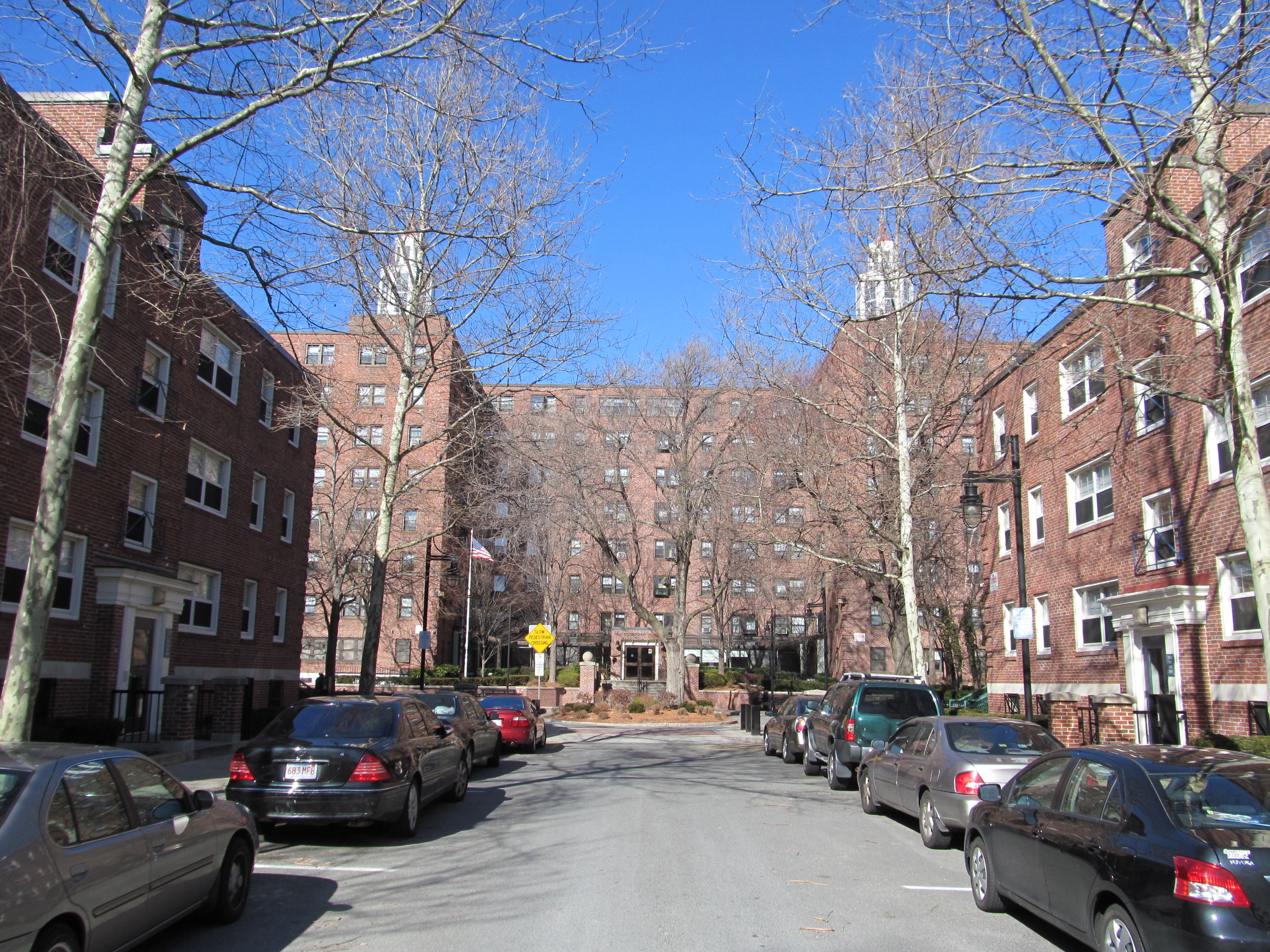
Roosevelt Towers

Wellington-Harrington, also known as Area 3, is a neighborhood in Cambridge, Massachusetts. Overlapping with Inman Square and Kendall Square, it is bounded by Hampshire Street and Broadway on the southwest, the Grand Junction railroad tracks on the east, and the Somerville town line on the north.

Though primarily residential, the neighborhood includes commercial areas along Cambridge Street and in the One Kendall Square plaza in the southeast.

As of 1990, Wellington-Harrington had the highest population of immigrants of any neighborhood in Cambridge, with 40% of its residents born outside the United States, as compared to 20% in Cambridge as a whole. The neighborhood has a high population of linguistic minorities, and 40% of residents speak a language other than English at home. In 2010, it had a population of 6,516 residents living in 2,996 households, making it the second-most densely populated neighborhood in Cambridge, after Mid-Cambridge. The median household income was $50,593.

The name Wellington-Harrington likely derives from the names of two former schools in the area: Wellington Elementary School and Charles G. Harrington Elementary School.

== History ==
Andrew Craigie invested heavily in land in the area, which led to the construction of the Craigie Bridge in 1809. The completion of the bridge prompted the construction of Cambridge Street to allow easy travel to Harvard Square. Hampshire Street, then the start of the Middlesex Turnpike, was completed around 1810.

The James B. Barnes House, a Federal-style brick house built in 1824 for a glassmaker at the New England Glass Company, was originally in East Cambridge on Monsignor O'Brien Highway but was moved to 109 Hampshire Street in 1984.

Prior to the Civil War, residential growth was slow in Wellington-Harrington due to its relative isolation from Central Square. The construction of the Grand Junction Railroad, which was completed in 1856, promoted new industries in the area including soap-making, woodworking, food processing. This dramatically increased the neighborhood's population.

Many of the neighborhood's earliest residents were of Irish and Canadian ancestry. Immigrant groups included northern and eastern Europeans, especially from Sweden and Russia, and a large Portuguese population. The Portuguese influx began around 1900 but declined in the 1920s because of restrictive immigration laws. A spike in Portuguese population occurred after the Immigration Act of 1965, which eliminated quotas and allowed many new immigrants to join their families already living in the United States.

During the 20th century, the residents of Wellington-Harrington resisted multiple urban development and renewal programs that would have dislocated many from their homes. The Inner Belt Expressway would have divided the neighborhood along Elm Street but was never built because of backlash from various communities along its proposed route.

== Notable residents ==
Wellington-Harrington was home to Lunsford Lane, a former slave and prominent abolitionist, who lived on Webster Avenue from 1848 to 1860.

John J. Fatal, an abolitionist, supporter of the Underground Railroad, and member of the Cambridge Common Council, moved to Cambridge in 1859. He lived on Lincoln Street in Wellington-Harrington at the time of his death in 1904.
