= Henry Crimmel =

German-American glassmaker (1844–1917)

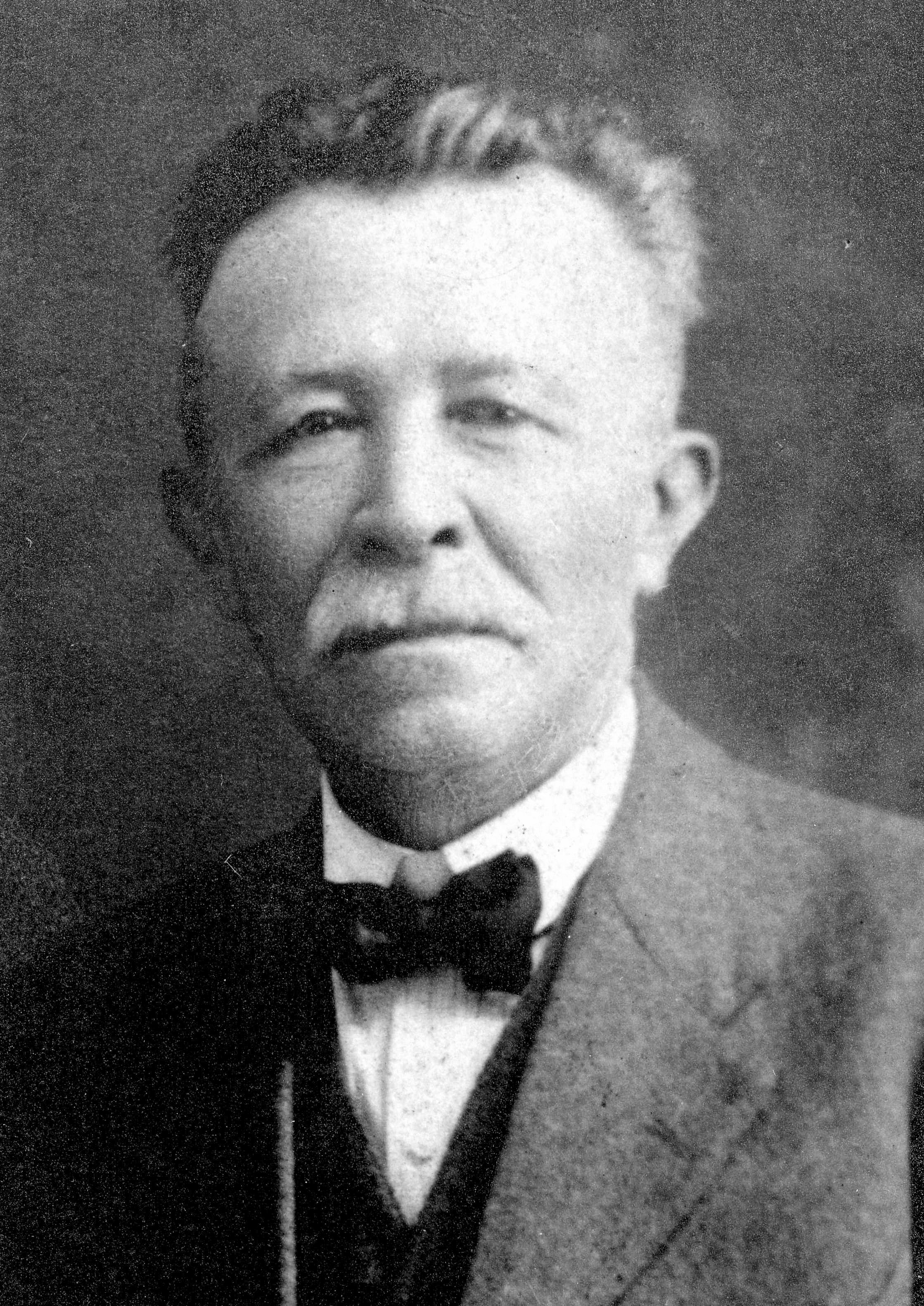
- circa 1914
- Born: February 14, 1844; Hesse, Germany
- Died: October 10, 1917; Hartford City, Indiana, US
- Known for: Glassmaker, American Civil War Veteran
- Spouse: Catharine Hammond
- Children: 2 sons, 1 daughter

Henry Crimmel (February 14, 1844 – October 10, 1917) was an American glassmaker who became well known in Ohio and Indiana. A German that came with his family to America at the age of eight years, the American Civil War veteran started at the lowest level in glass making, and learned every aspect of the business. A skilled glassblower known for his glassmaking expertise and the recipient of two patents, he also worked in management in at least three glass factories – and was one of the co-founders of the Novelty Glass Company (of Fostoria) and the reorganized version of Sneath Glass Company. He retired with over 50 years in the industry.

== Identity and origins ==
In 1852, the Crimmel family emigrated from the Hessen region of what is now Germany to South Wheeling, Virginia. Wheeling had a German population that may have attracted the family. Immigrants from this time period often, upon arrival in the United States, would ride trains to Pittsburgh, Pennsylvania, and then ride in boats down the Ohio River to settle in cities along the way. An alternative route to Wheeling (from Baltimore) involved the Baltimore & Ohio Railroad and/or the National Road. Although Hessians had been making glass since the Middle Ages, it is not known if the Crimmel family members learned glassmaking skills in Europe. However, Henry Crimmel's father and both brothers were also glassmakers. Germans were being recruited to work in glass factories during the 1850s. By the 1870s, family members lived across the river from Wheeling in Bellaire, Ohio.

== American Civil War ==
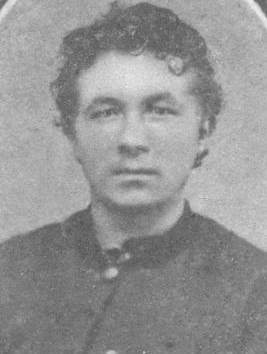
Henry Crimmel in uniform about 1862.

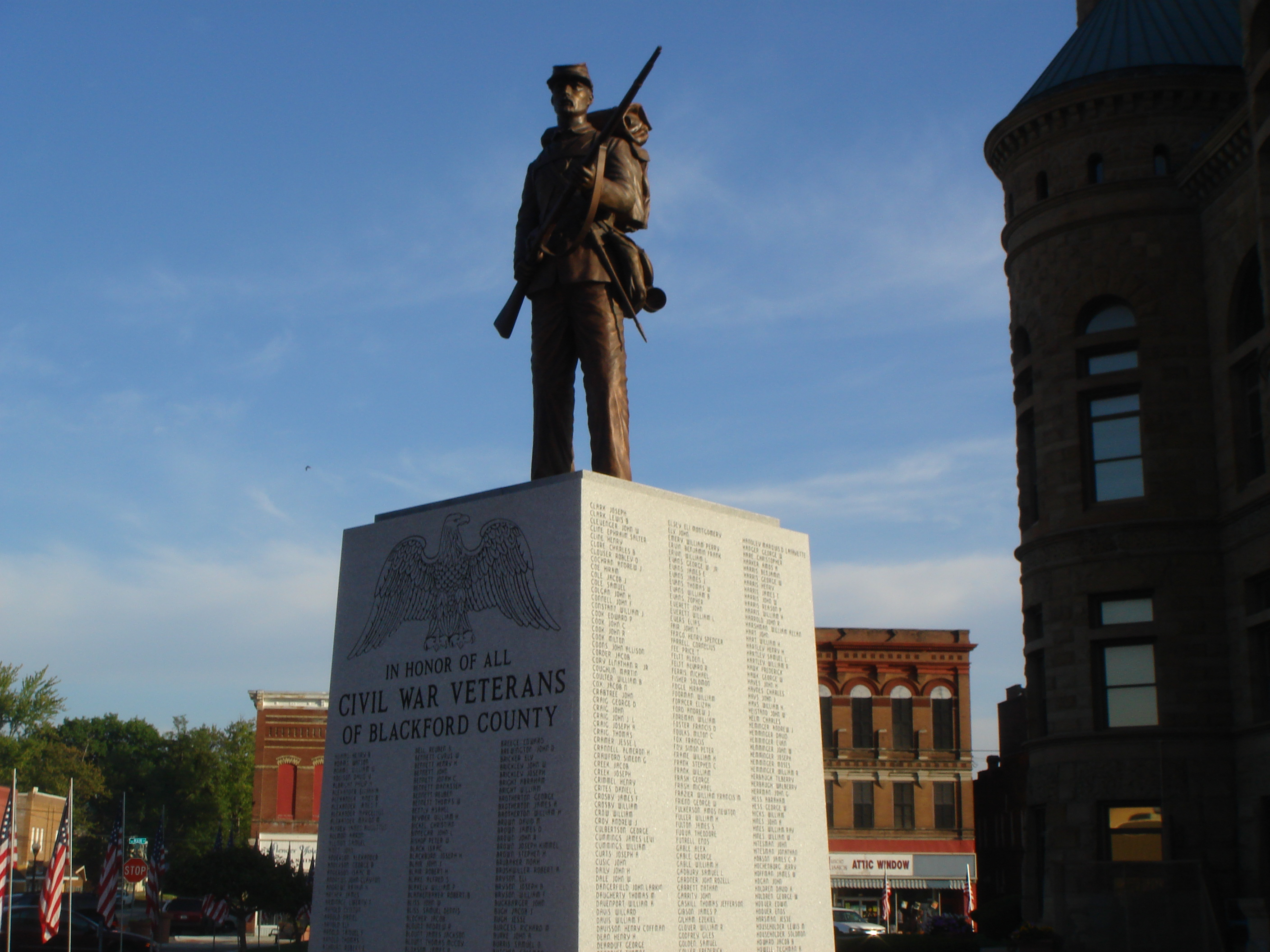
Blackford County Civil War monument in Hartford City, Indiana.

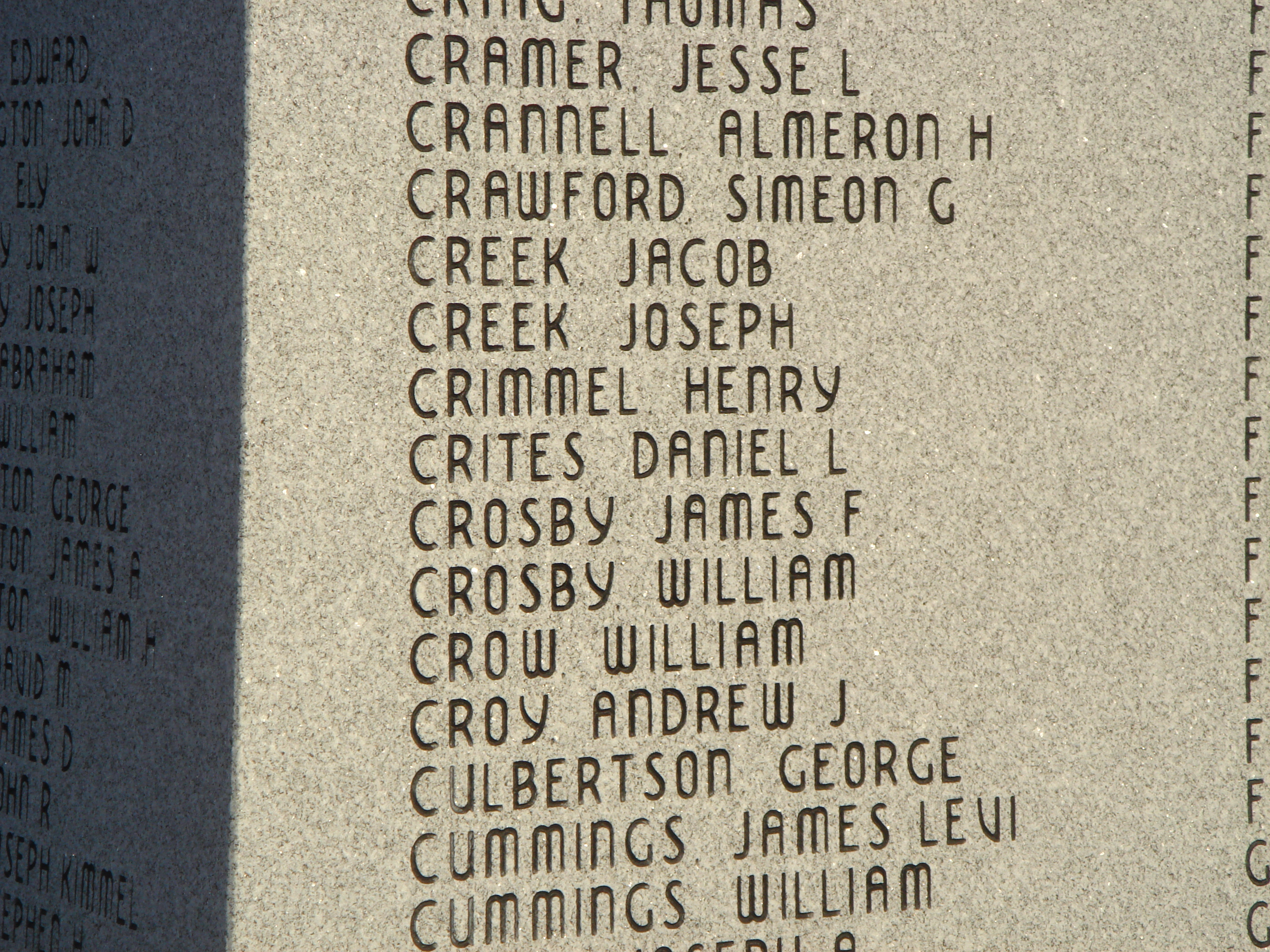
Henry Crimmel's name on Blackford Civil War monument.

On December 20, 1860, the state of South Carolina adopted an ordinance to secede from the Union of the United States, and six more southern states seceded in the next three months. On April 12, 1861, the Battle of Fort Sumter marked the start of the American Civil War. More southern states rebelled and voted to secede from the union, including Virginia on April 17, 1861. These "rebel" states organized themselves into the Confederate States of America.

The city of Bellaire, located in Ohio across the Ohio River from the state of Virginia and the city Wheeling, assumed some strategic importance because of the railroads on both sides of the river and the fact that the Ohio River served as the border between the state of Ohio (pro-Union) and the state of Virginia (voted to secede from the Union). Bellaire became a staging area for Ohio and Indiana Union troops to cross into the South and move by rail using the Baltimore and Ohio Railroad. There was some fear that rebels from Virginia would cross into Ohio through Bellaire. A training camp was located in the city, and numerous soldiers passed through the town to fight in the south. It is therefore not surprising that 17-year-old Henry Crimmel enlisted to fight in the Civil War. Many of the workers at South Wheeling's Hobbs Glass works also enlisted.

Henry Crimmel was part of Company I of the Second Virginia Volunteer Cavalry, which fought for the Union instead of the Confederacy. The Second (West) Virginia Cavalry was composed mainly of recruits from Ohio. The governor of Ohio declined to organize this cavalry, so it was organized in Virginia. It is not extraordinary for someone that lived in southern Ohio (such as Bellaire) to identify with Wheeling, since some of those citizens of Ohio worked on the Virginia side of the river. Although the city of Wheeling was part of the state of Virginia, the city is located in the north, and there was dissent in the Wheeling area about secession. The western portion of Virginia, which included Wheeling, eventually became a separate state known as West Virginia, which was loyal to the Union.

Henry Crimmel began his military career as a private, and finished as a bugler. By the end of the war, Crimmel's cavalry unit was known as Company I of the 2nd Regiment, West Virginia Cavalry. During the war, the Regiment lost a total of 196 men that were killed, mortally wounded, or died from disease. The 2nd Regiment West Virginia Cavalry served in West Virginia, Virginia, and Maryland – including a battle in Lynchburg against an army under the command of Confederate General Jubal Early that involved a total of 40,000 troops. A battle in Winchester (a.k.a. Opequon) matched a total of 54,000 troops under command of General Philip Sheridan for the Union and General Jubal Early for the rebels. This Union victory is considered by many historians to be the most important battle of the Shenandoah Valley campaign. Crimmel served in the cavalry from 1861 until November 1864, when he was honorably discharged. All West Virginia soldiers that served for the Union, and were honorably discharged, were awarded one of the Medals of Honor for West Virginia Soldiers.

After the war, Henry Crimmel joined the Grand Army of the Republic, an organization for Union Civil War veterans. He was the original officer of the guard for the local chapter. His name is on at least two monuments honoring veterans of the Civil War. One is located in his original American hometown of Bellaire, Ohio. Eleven of the 41 soldiers listed on the Bellaire monument fought for West Virginia units instead of Ohio. At least two of these West Virginia soldiers (Henry Crimmel and John Robinson) were known to have worked in the glass business. The other monument with Henry Crimmel's name on it is the Blackford County Civil War monument (see photos), located in Hartford City, Indiana. Mr. Crimmel spent the last 23 years of his life in Hartford City, and he is buried in the city's main cemetery.

== Glassmaking – the early years ==
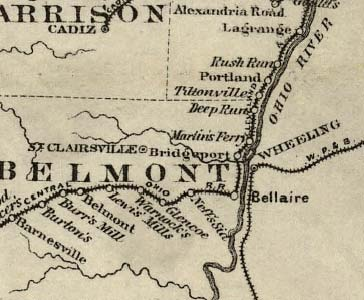
Bellaire-Wheeling 1873

The Wheeling-Bellaire region was a good location for manufacturing because of its fuel and transportation resources. Bellaire (Belmont County) had coal, railroad service, and the Ohio River. Wheeling also had railroad service and the Ohio River. The National Road went through both cities. The first known glass factory for which Henry Crimmel worked was the Hobbs works in Wheeling, (West) Virginia. Glass had been made in Wheeling as early as 1821, and there were three "glass houses" by 1886. The Hobbs plant had a transportation advantage because it was located very close to the Ohio River. Henry Crimmel's brother Jacob also worked at the Hobbs plant, and there is a high probability that older brother John also worked at the same plant—simply because there were not many alternatives at the time. Many years later, one of Jacob Crimmel's American Flint magazine articles described working for the Hobbs Glass Works in 1861, meaning that he was about 13 years old when he started working there. In the 1860s, duties for youngsters just getting started at glass works often involved adding coal and/or wood to furnaces.

All three Crimmel brothers are listed by the 1870 U.S. Census as glassblowers living in different locations in Bellaire, Ohio. Bellaire, Ohio became known as "Glass City" during the period of 1870 to 1885 because of the number of glass factories in the area. The first glass factory in Bellaire was the Belmont Glass Company (a.k.a. Belmont Glass Works), and some of the Belmont's founders were former employees of the Hobbs works in Wheeling – including Civil War veteran John Robinson. Both Henry and Jacob Crimmel worked at the Belmont Glass works, and Henry was a manager. Older brother and Bellaire resident John Crimmel is also believed to have worked at that works. The plant began as a maker of chimneys, but changed to a maker of pressed glassware. Some of the well known glassmakers of the West Virginia-Ohio-Indiana area worked there before they gained their fame. Eventually, the Belmont factory closed in 1890 after an economic recession.

Crimmel left the Belmont Glass Works

Natural gas was discovered in 1887 in the Findley-Tiffin-Fostoria area of Ohio, and this caused many of the glass houses elsewhere to relocate to be near this low-cost resource. The Fostoria Glass Company started in December 1887, and both Henry and Jacob Crimmel were considered important craftsmen in its early years. Crimmel recipes for various colors of glass are thought to have been used in the early days of this glass works. Several Crimmel family members were involved in the startup of this plant, and Crimmels were also stockholders.

Although Jacob Crimmel would remain with Fostoria Glass through its eventual move to West Virginia, Henry Crimmel became involved with Novelty Glass Company of Fostoria. Novelty was located on the original Fostoria site for the Buttler Art Glass Company, which was destroyed by fire in 1889. Henry Crimmel and his son, A. C. Crimmel were among a group of six listed as the "incorporators". Henry Crimmel was the plant manager, while son A. C. Crimmel was the new company's secretary. The works opened in early 1891, making items such as figurine salt shakers, punch bowls, cups, and other blown-ware. Glass bottles were also one of the plant's products, and in 1892 Henry received a patent for a bottle and stopper combination that could be resealed but not refilled. The original Novelty Glass Company was short-lived: it became part of the U.S. Glass Company (as Factory T) in mid-1892, and was destroyed by fire in 1893.

== Glassmaking – the later years ==
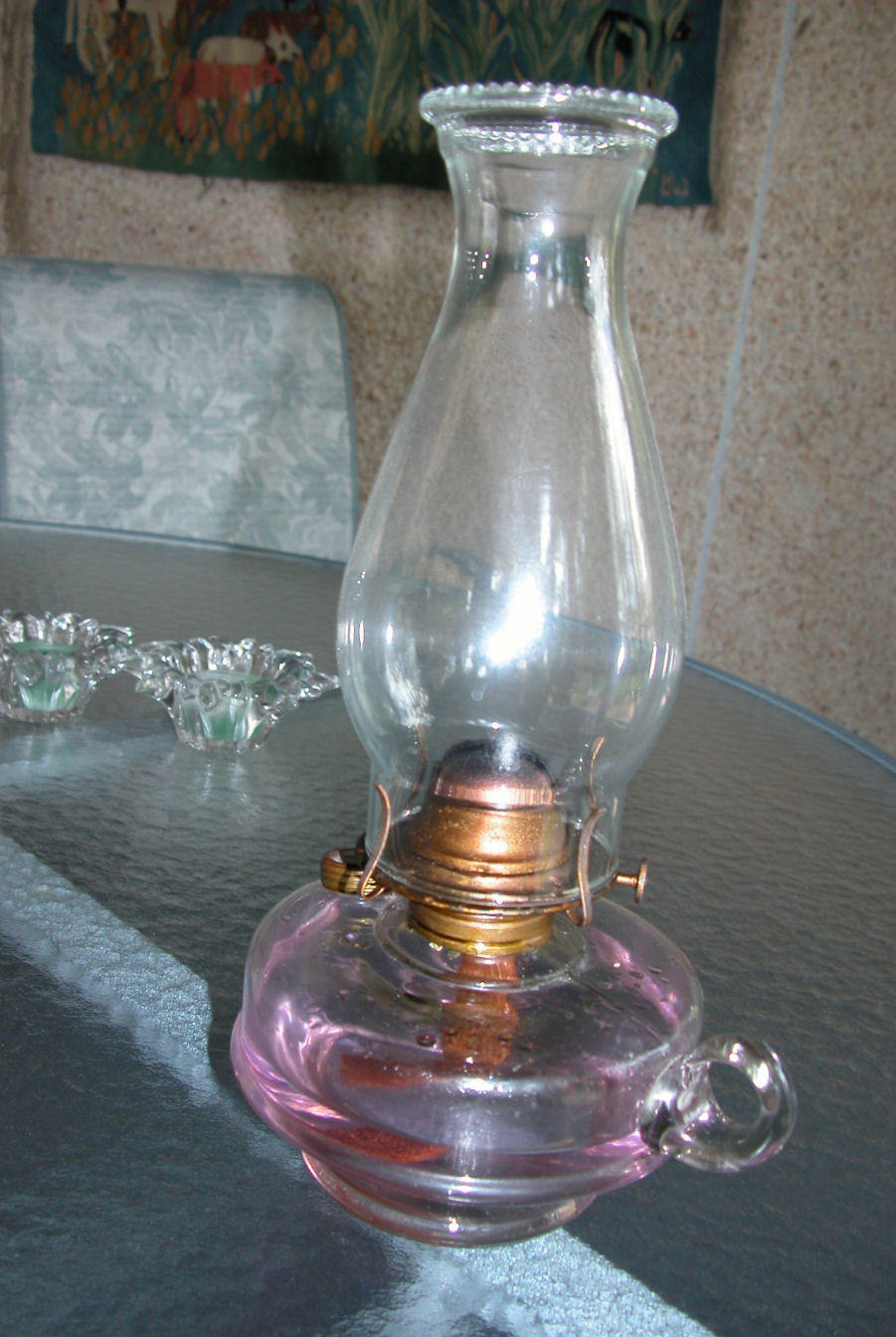
Lantern made by Sneath Glass Company

Shortly after the closing of the Novelty Glass Company, Henry Crimmel joined the Sneath Glass Company in Tiffin, Ohio, as plant manager. The Tiffin plant burnt down, but was reorganized using insurance money and a subsidy from a community in Indiana. The new version of the Sneath Glass Company was led by Henry Crimmel and Ralph Sneath. Similar to the transformation of Fostoria after the discovery of natural gas in the area, the Indiana Gas Boom in east central Indiana caused many factories to move to Indiana. Sneath Glass relocated to Hartford City, Indiana in 1894, and Henry Crimmel was manager of the new plant. He was also part owner and a member of the company's board of directors. Mr. Crimmel had about 30 years of experience by then, and he applied his glass-making skills toward making his employees more efficient. Glassblowers at the Sneath plant were aided by a unique system of air hoses that enabled them to be more productive. Henry Crimmel also received another patent in 1904 for a "Glass Drawing Machine" that was an improvement for glass blowing and prevented irregularities in the glass. The Sneath Glass plant made lantern globes and founts during its early years. During the 1905 to 1915 period, the company began to put less emphasis on lantern-related blown-ware, and more production involved glass canisters for portable kitchen cabinets. By 1910, the factory employed about 150 people.

Glassmaking was a family business for the Crimmels. Brothers John, Henry, and Jacob Crimmel were glassmakers, and at times two or more of them worked at the same plant. One of Henry Crimmel's sons was a partner with his father in the Sneath Glass Company, and two grandsons also worked at the Sneath plant and eventually became part of management. Three of Henry Crimmel's great-grandsons eventually spent time at the plant long after Henry Crimmel's death, and a great-great-grandson worked briefly at Indiana Glass Company. Both John and Jacob Crimmel also had children that worked in the glass business.

In 1916, Henry Crimmel suffered a stroke, and was forced to completely retire. Although he recovered enough to take walks around town, he also had heart trouble. On October 10, 1917, he died from heart failure.
