= Northwood Glass Company =

Defunct American art glass manufacturer

H. Northwood Company logo

The Northwood glass company was a manufacturer of art glass in various locations in the United States from 1887 to 1925.

== History ==
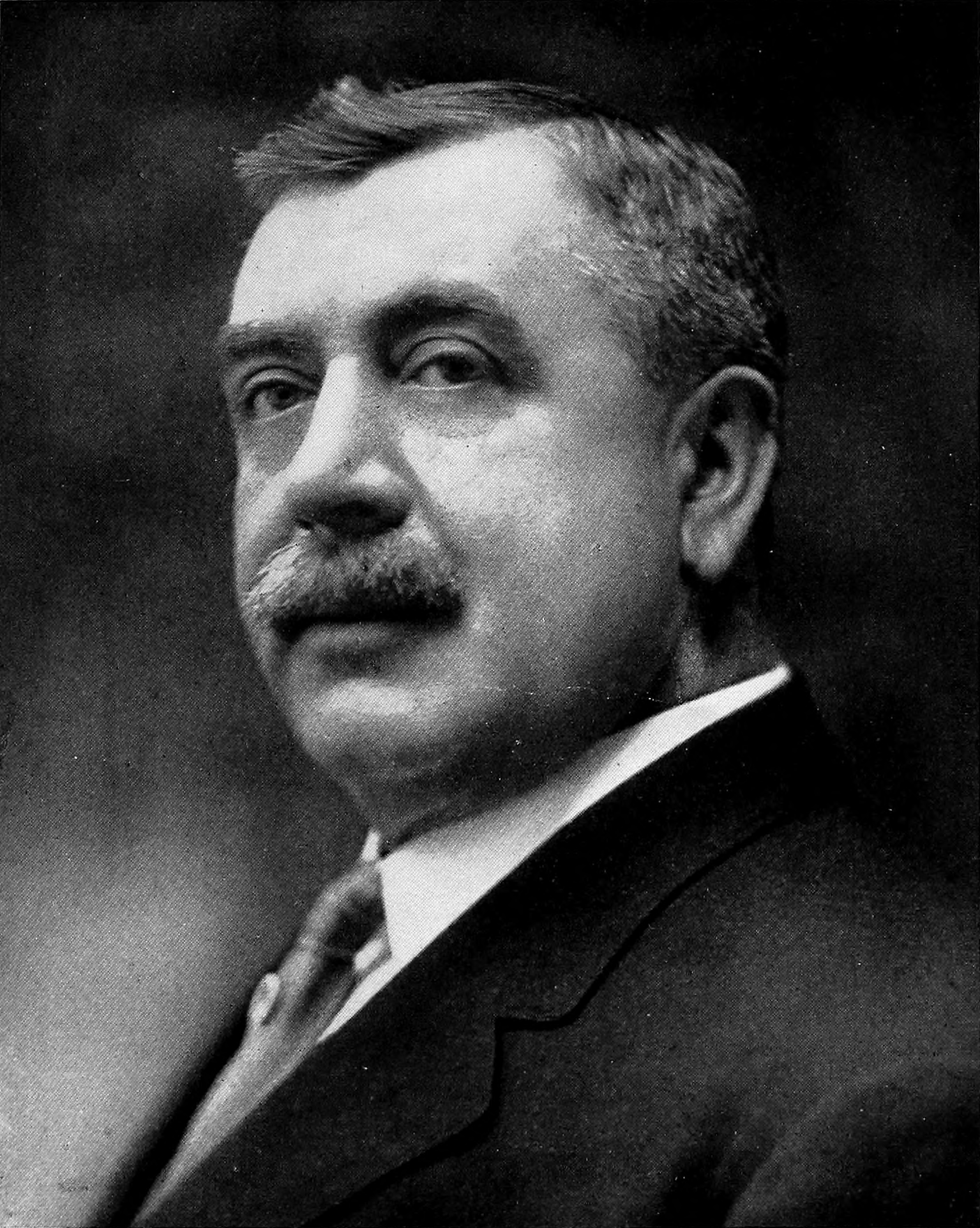
Harry Northwood c. 1912

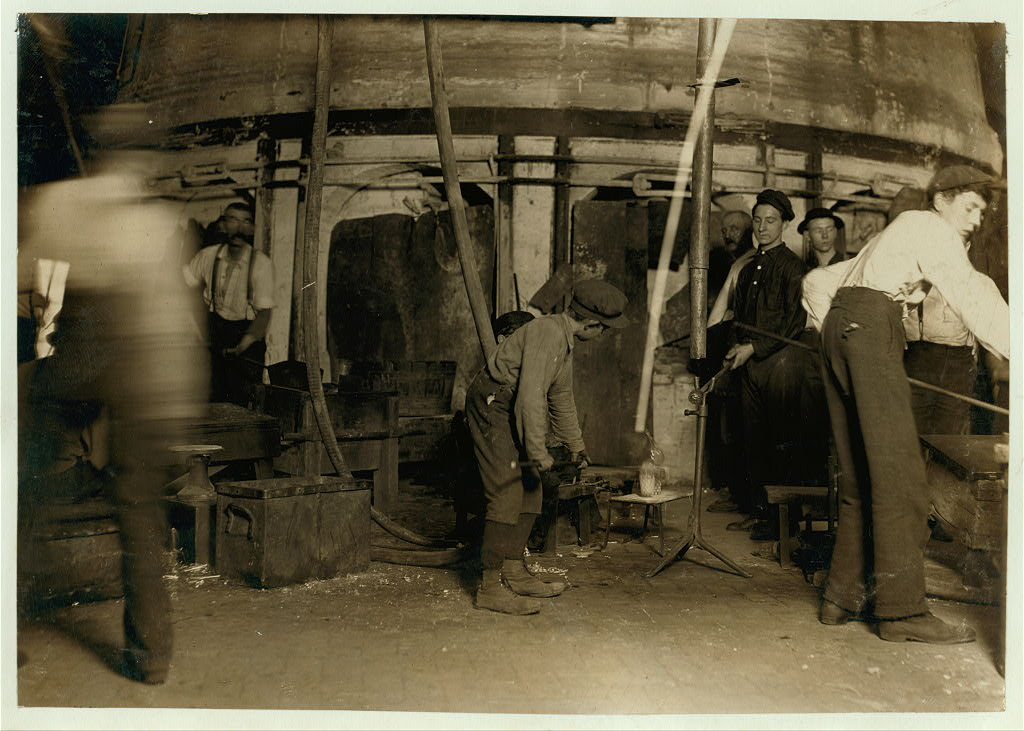
Northwood glass works in West Virginia, October 1908.

Harry Northwood who founded the company was the son of John Northwood, a noted maker of English cameo glass. He came to America in 1880 and worked at J. H. Hobbs, Brockunier and Company. He worked as a glass etcher there from approximately 1881–1884. He then worked for the La Belle glass company and during a strike there moved to Phoenix glass company in Pittsburgh, Pa. He became a glass maker when he returned to La Belle about 1886.

The original Northwood Glass Company was established by Harry Northwood in 1887 in Martins Ferry, Ohio. However, the company was later relocated to Ellwood City, Pennsylvania, where it failed to thrive. In 1895 he opened up the New Northwood glass company in a factory previously owned by the Indiana Glass company in Indiana, Pennsylvania. This factory joined National glass conglomerate in 1899.

In 1902 Harry opened the Harry Northwood and company factory in Wheeling, West Virginia. The factory had belonged to the J. H. Hobbs, Brockunier and Company. It was here that he developed his formula for Carnival glass.

Harry Northwood died in 1919. The company continued producing glass, but was closed in 1925.

== Colors ==
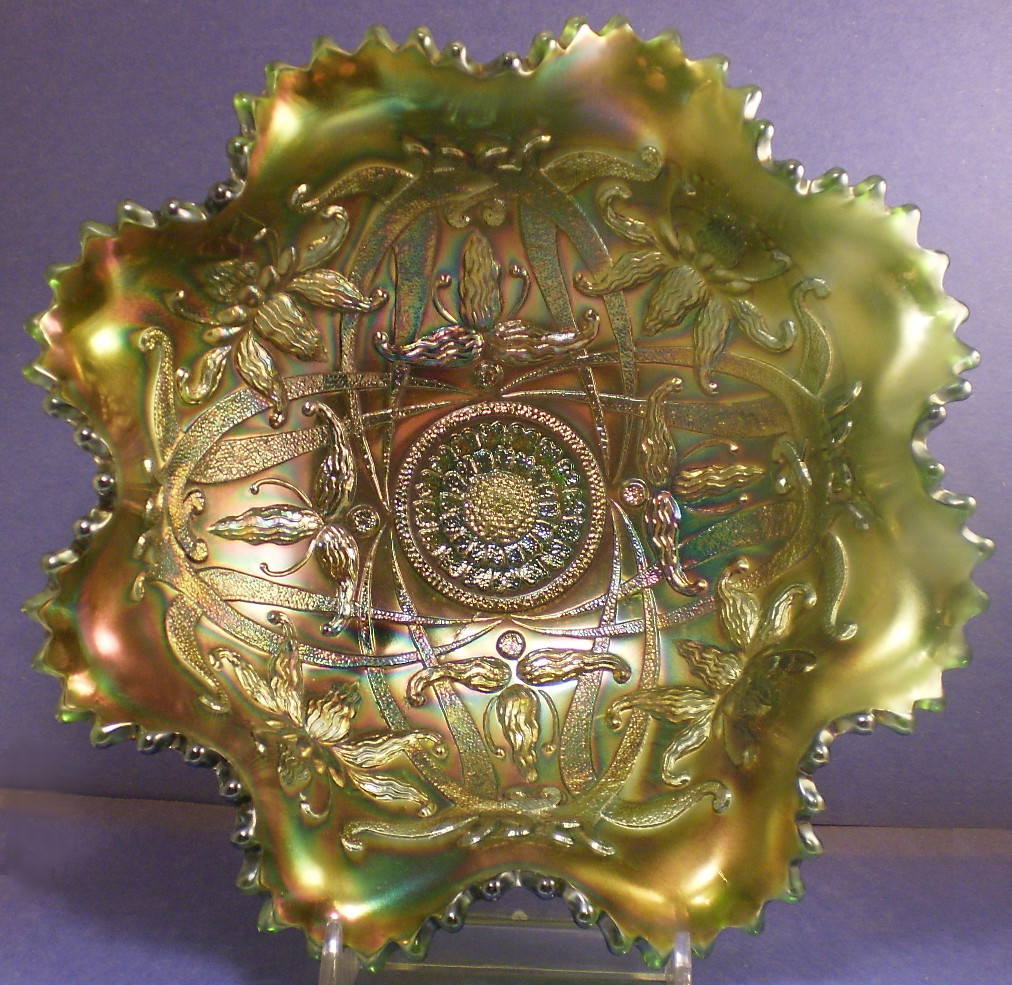
Green Wishbone bowl

Golden Iris was the name of the first caravel glass treatment that Northwood developed in 1908. It was known for its marigold color. The other carnival glass treatments made by Northwood were Emerald, Azure, Florentine, Perl, and Pomona. Carnival glass is identified by the color of the glass, not the color of the treatment. Base colors for Northwood were green, amethyst, and cobalt blue. Ice green, white, and ice blue were the names of the pastel colors. Northwood also made custard, stretch and opalescent glass.

== Patterns ==
Some of the patterns were:

Name	Years Produced	Description	Reference
Cherry and Cable		Early pattern made in very limited numbers. One of the first patterns to receive carnival treatment.	
Corn		Used on vases, looks like an ear of corn. There are two variations showing different leaves.	
Feathers		Used for vases, alternating herringbone and smooth panels.	
Grape and Cable		Northwood produced a large amount of this pattern. There were two variations of the pattern with one having more vine in the center.	
Three Fruits	1910	The pattern includes fruits and foliage. The Fenton glass also had a similar pattern.	
Wishbone		This was used on bowls and plates of two different sizes, 8 and 10 inch. It is identified by its overlapping wishbone shapes.	

== Maker mark ==
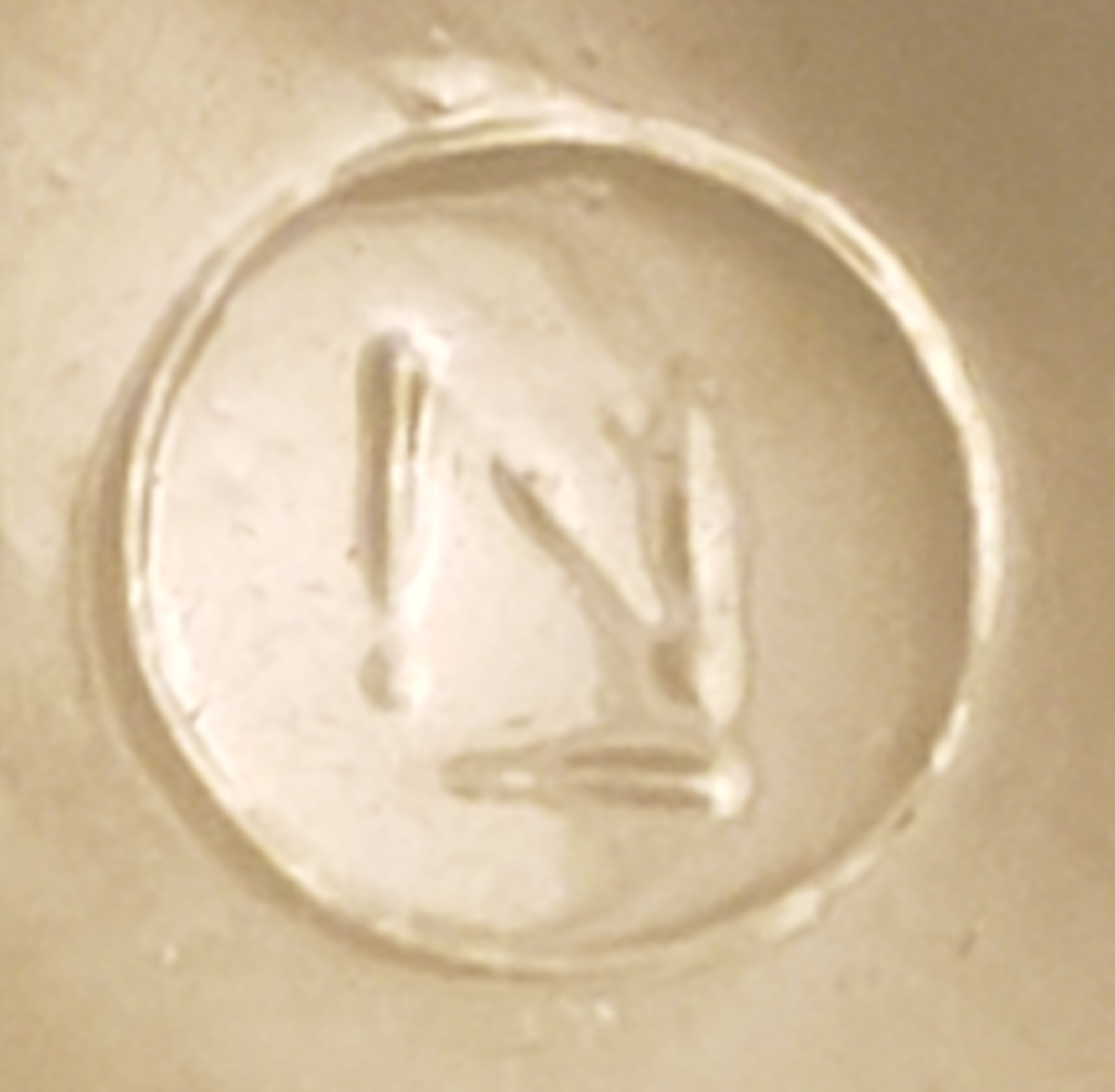
Northwood mark on a vase

The most common Northwood maker mark was an underlined capital N centered inside of a circle. Not all pieces carry the mark but it is seen most often on carnival glass items. L.G. Wright also used a mark like it, but was forced to stop using it.
