= Michael Joseph Owens =

American inventor

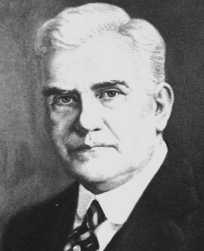
- Born: January 1, 1859; Mason County, West Virginia, U.S.
- Died: December 27, 1923 (aged 64); Toledo, Ohio, U.S.
- Spouse: Mary E. McKelvey (m. 1890)
- Children: 4
- Engineering career
- Projects: automated production of glass bottles
- Awards: Elliott Cresson Medal (1915)

Michael Joseph Owens (January 1, 1859 – December 27, 1923) was an inventor of machines to automate the production of glass bottles.

== Early life and education ==
Owens was born on January 1, 1859, in Point Pleasant, West Virginia, to Joseph Owens and Mary Owens (née Chapman), both destitute immigrants from County Wexford, Ireland. His father was a coal miner.

He left school at the age of 10 to start a glassware apprenticeship at J. H. Hobbs, Brockunier and Company in Wheeling, West Virginia.

== Career ==
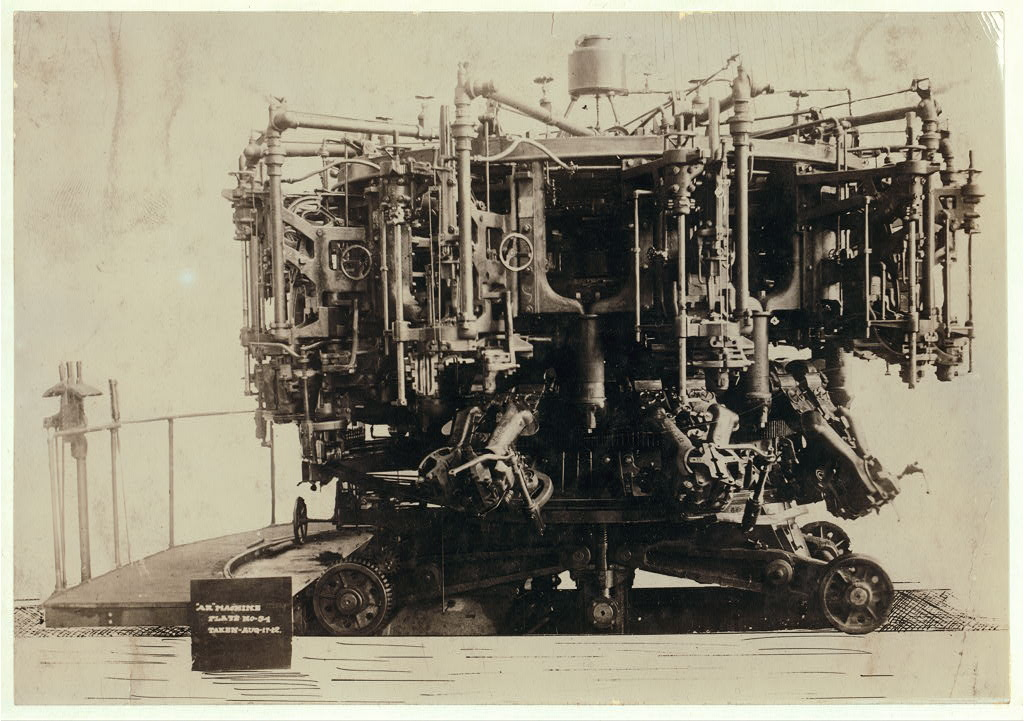
A ten-arm owens automatic bottle machine, c. 1913, photo by Lewis Hine

In 1888 he moved to Toledo, Ohio, and worked for the Toledo Glass Factory owned by Edward Drummond Libbey. He was later promoted to foreman and then to supervisor. In 1891 Libbey opened a new plant in Findlay, Ohio, and Owens was put in charge of making the glass bulbs for Edison General Electric’s electric lights. There he simplified the process by inventing a mould-opening device which could be operated by a glassblower by foot and came up with a paste that prevent the bulbs from sticking to the moulds. This lowered the cost of bulbs by 90%, making them much more available for people. He formed the Owens Bottle Machine Company in 1903. His machines could produce glass bottles at a rate of 240 per minute, and reduce labor costs by 80%.

Owens and Libbey entered into a partnership and the company was renamed the Owens Bottle Company in 1919. In 1929 the company merged with the Illinois Glass Company to become the Owens-Illinois Glass Company.

== Personal life ==
Owens married Mary E. McKelvey in 1890. They had two children;

- Hazel Augusta Owens (1890-1969), who married Daniel Joseph McGettigan (1886-1942)
- John Raymond Owens (1894-1947), who married Florence Grace Whalen (b. 1897), and had one daughter.

He would later remarry and have a second family with Mollie Owens (b. 1873) with two children;

- Ray Owens (born 1899)
- Florence Owens (born 1899)

He died on December 27, 1923, aged 64 at his residence in Toledo, Ohio.

== Patents ==
- U.S. patent 534,840 Apparatus for blowing glass
- U.S. patent 548,587 Machine for blowing glass
- U.S. patent 548,588 Machine for blowing glass
- U.S. patent 766,768 Glass Shaping Machine
- U.S. patent 774,690 Glass Shaping Machine
