= Carnival glass =

Type of glass

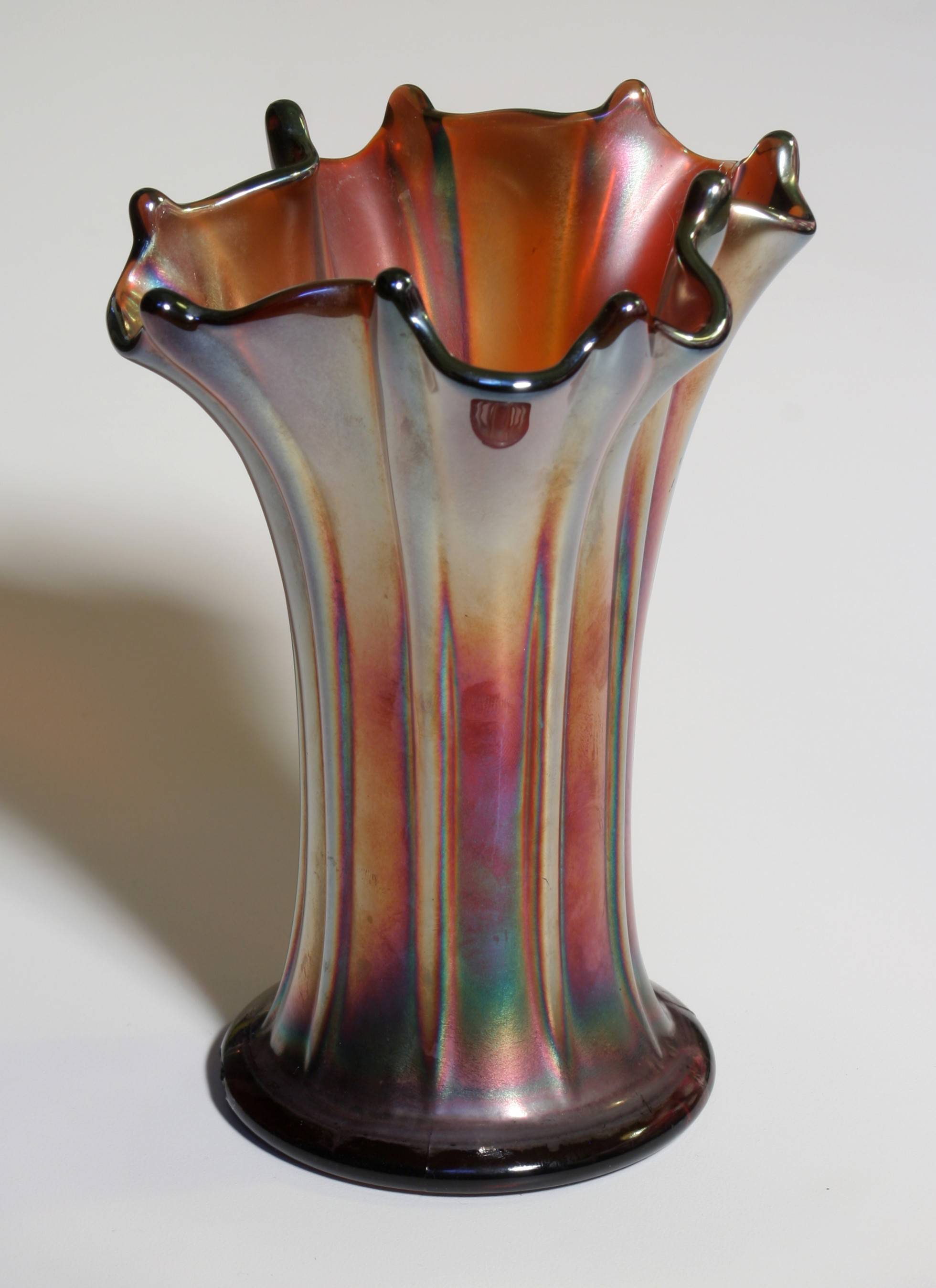
A carnival glass vase.

Carnival glass is moulded or pressed glass with an applied iridescent surface shimmer. It has previously been referred to as aurora glass, dope glass, rainbow glass, taffeta glass, and disparagingly as 'poor man's Tiffany'. The name Carnival glass was adopted by collectors in the 1950s as the items were sometimes given as prizes at carnivals, fetes, and fairgrounds. However, evidence suggests that the vast majority of it was purchased by households to brighten homes at a time when only the well-off could afford electric lighting, as the finish catches the light even in dark corners. From the beginning of the 20th century, carnival glass was mass-produced around the world, but largely in the U.S. It reached the height of its popularity in the 1920s, though it is still produced in small quantities today.

Carnival glass gets its iridescent sheen from the application of metallic salts while the glass is still hot from the pressing. It was designed to look like the finer and much more expensive blown iridescent glass by makers such as Tiffany. Both functional and ornamental objects were produced in the carnival finish, with a wide variety of patterns, styles, and colors with ranging complexity. Pieces featuring rare colours are sought after by collectors.

== History ==
Carnival glass originated as a glass called 'Iridill', produced beginning in 1908 by the Fenton Art Glass Company. Iridill was inspired by the fine blown art glass of such makers as Tiffany and Steuben, but did not sell at the anticipated premium prices and subsequently discounted. After these markdowns, Iridill pieces were used as carnival prizes.

After Iridill became popular and profitable, Fenton went on to produce a variety of items in this finish in over 150 patterns. Fenton maintained its position as the largest manufacturer and was one of few makers to use a red coloured glass base for their carnival glass. After interest waned in the late 1920s, Fenton stopped producing carnival glass. Due to a resurgence in interest in more recent years, Fenton restarted production of carnival glass until its closure in 2007.

Most U.S. carnival glass was made before 1925, with production in decline after 1931. Some production continued outside the US through the Great Depression years of the early 1930s, and tapered off by the 1940s.

The same moulds were often used to produce clear and colored glass in addition to carnival versions, so producers could easily switch production between these finishes according to demand.

== Variations ==
=== Colours ===
Carnival glass was made in a wide array of colours, shades, colour combinations and variants, with more than fifty have being formally classified. These classifications do not go by the surface colours showing, but by the 'base' colours of the glass before the application of the mineral salts that cause the iridescent finish.

The base colour is determined by finding an area of the item which had no mineral salts applied, often the base, and viewing light through the area. It can occasionally be difficult to differentiate the exact base colour, as there are often only subtle differences between variations.

The final surface shades vary according to the depth of base colour, if special treatments are present, and the type and amount of salts used. This last variable causes significant variation to occur, even between batches of the same color. This happened most frequently in early production with collectors now differentiating between these items by the amount of iridescence.

The most popular colour for carnival glass is called 'marigold' by collectors. Marigold has a clear glass base and is the most easily recognizable carnival colour. The final surface colours of marigold are mostly a bright orange-gold to copper with small areas showing rainbow or 'oil-slick' highlights. These highlights appear most often on ridges in the pattern and vary in strength according to the light.

Marigold carnival glass is the most common colour and generally commands lower prices in the collector market. However, variants of marigold such as those based on 'moonstone', a translucent white, and 'milk glass', an opaque white base, can be more sought after. Other base colours include amethyst, a reddish purple, blue, green, red, and amber. These basic colours are further delineated by shade, colour depth, and colour combinations. Examples include amberina, slag glass, special treatments such as 'opalescent,' and luminescence such as that given off by 'vaseline glass' or 'uranium glass' under ultra violet light.

=== Shapes ===
Carnival glass was produced in a wide variety of items, from utilitarian to the purely decorative. Items coming from the same mold could be further customized by changing the shape while the glass was still hot and malleable. Edge styles varied from plain, frilled, pie crust, furrowed or bullet. This could be built into the mold or shaped by hand after the molding process.

The basic items produced included bowls, plates, vases, jugs, pitchers, tumblers. More specialized tableware included large centre piece items such as jardinières and float bowls, as well as smaller items such as butter dishes, celery vases, and cruet sets. Less common items include candle holders, ashtrays, and ornaments such as sculptures or statuettes.

=== Patterns ===
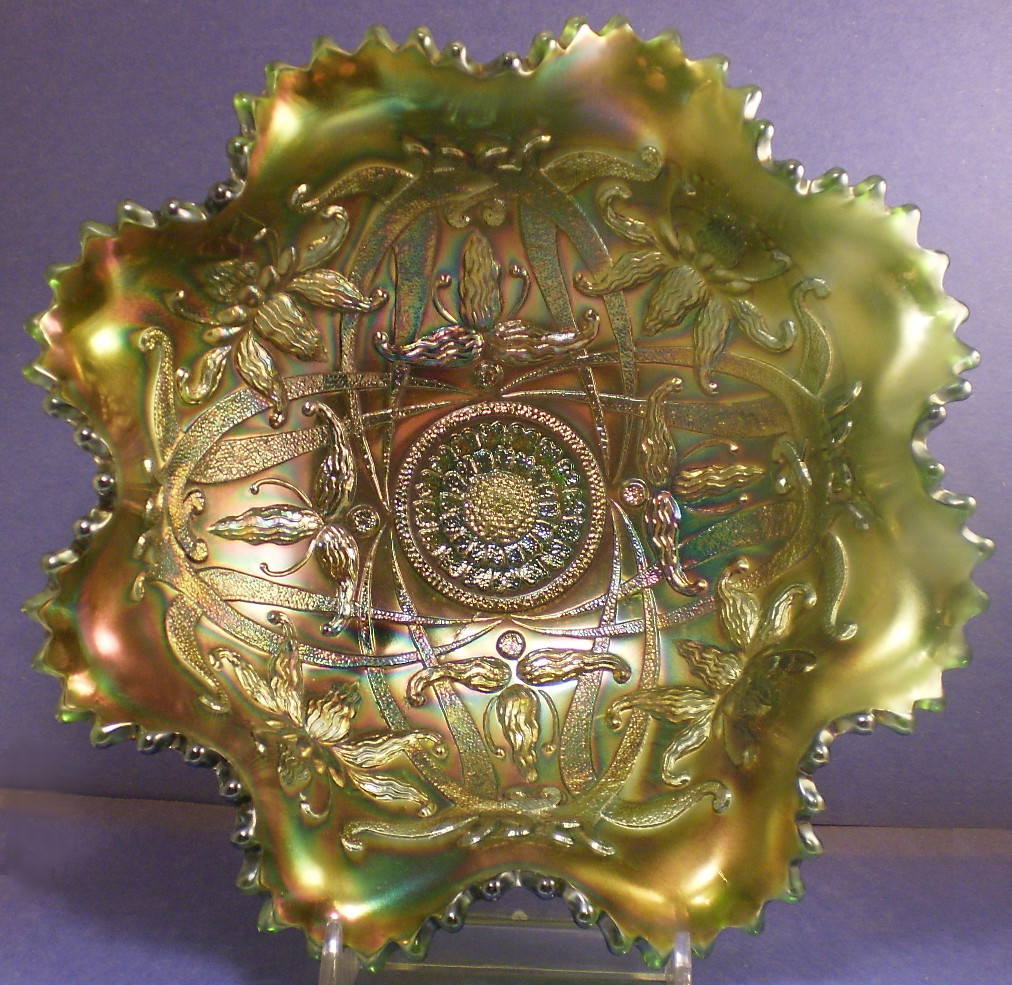
Example of a green Northwood Wishbone bowl.

Carnival glass was produced in large quantities in the US by the Fenton, Northwood, Imperial, Millersburg, Westmoreland, Dugan/Diamond, Cambridge, and U.S. Glass, as well as many smaller manufacturers. Pressed glass "blanks" were also purchased by third parties who applied the iridescent finish. Competition between companies lead to the continual development new patterns. By selling sample pieces to carnival fair operators, it was hoped that a winner would purchase other items in the same or a similar pattern.

Crown Crystal of Australia designed carnival glass with patterns of local flora and fauna. Sowerby from England is known for producing figurines in the carnival finish, such as swans, hens, dolphins, and even a boat. They also created the 'African Shield', 'King James' and 'Drape' patterns of glassware.

The Brockwitz glassworks of Germany produced geometric patterns inspired by cut glass. Other major European makers included Inwald (Czechoslovakia), Eda glasbruk (Sweden) and Riihimäki (Finland). These also produced cut glass styles and simple geometrics with a few floral patterns. The Czech Rindskopf produced the 'Classic Arts' and 'Egyptian Queen' patterns, notable for sporting stained bands of figures over a simple geometric forms in an even marigold.

Other global manufacturers include the Argentinian Cristalerias Rigolleau, known for their ash trays and Cristalerias Piccardo, which produced the 'Jewelled Peacock Tail' vase. The Indian Jain company is known for their elephant, fish and hand figurine sections incorporated into the body of trumpet shaped vases and complex goddess vases.

== Collectibles market ==
Carnival glass is collectible. Prices vary widely, ranging from a few dollars to thousands. Examples of carnival glass can be found in antique stores and eBay.

Identification of carnival glass is frequently difficult. Many manufacturers did not include a maker's mark on their product, while others did so for only part of the time they produced the glass. Identifying carnival glass involves matching patterns, colours, sheen, edges, thickness, and other factors from old manufacturer's trade catalogs, other known examples, or other reference material. Since many manufacturers produced close copies of their rivals' popular patterns, carnival glass identification can be challenging.

== See also ==
- Pressed glass
- Uranium glass
- Goofus glass
