= Magnor Glassverk =

Norwegian glass company

Magnor Glassworks (Magnor Glassverk AS) is a glass company located in Eidskog Municipality in Innlandet county, Norway.

== History ==
Eda glasbruk glassworks factory was first founded in 1830 by Carl Christopher Lampa and Lars Wilhelm Ahlbom in Eda kommun in Värmland County, Sweden. In 1842, new owners took over the glass factory and in 1862 moved a site in Surte, in Västra Götaland County, Sweden. A branch location, first known as Geijer Fors Glass Works, was started in 1896 at Magnor, a village in Eidskog Municipality in Hedmark county, Norway.

Magnor Glassworks was established in a forested area near the border between Norway and Sweden. The large forests supplied fuel for the melting furnaces. While the operations on the Swedish side of the border has ceased, Magnor Glassworks is still in operation and produces tableware, vases and other art objects in glass. The company has manufactured glassware designed by Norwegian fashion designer Per Spook and Norwegian painter and artist Vebjørn Sand.

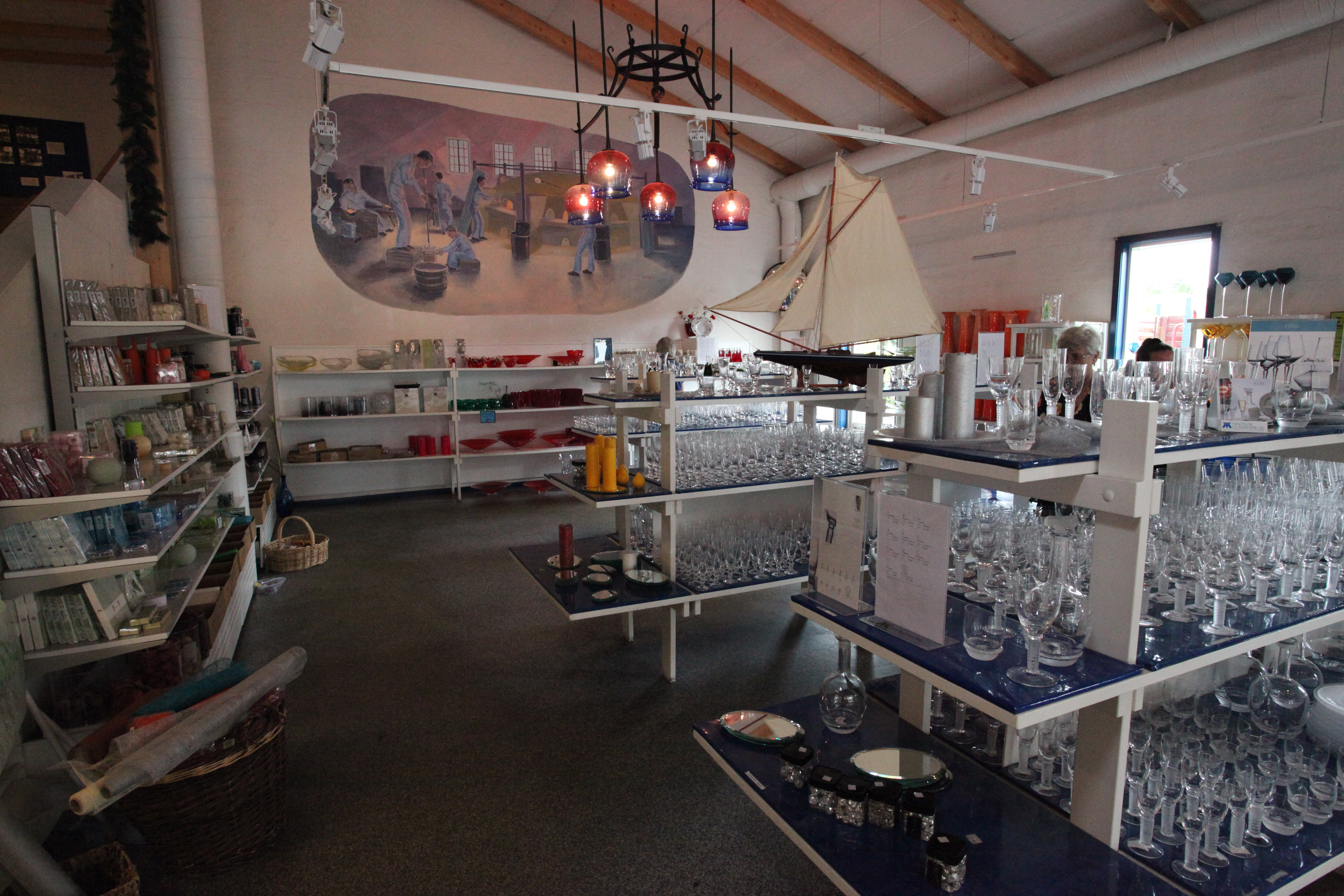
Magnor Glassverk interior

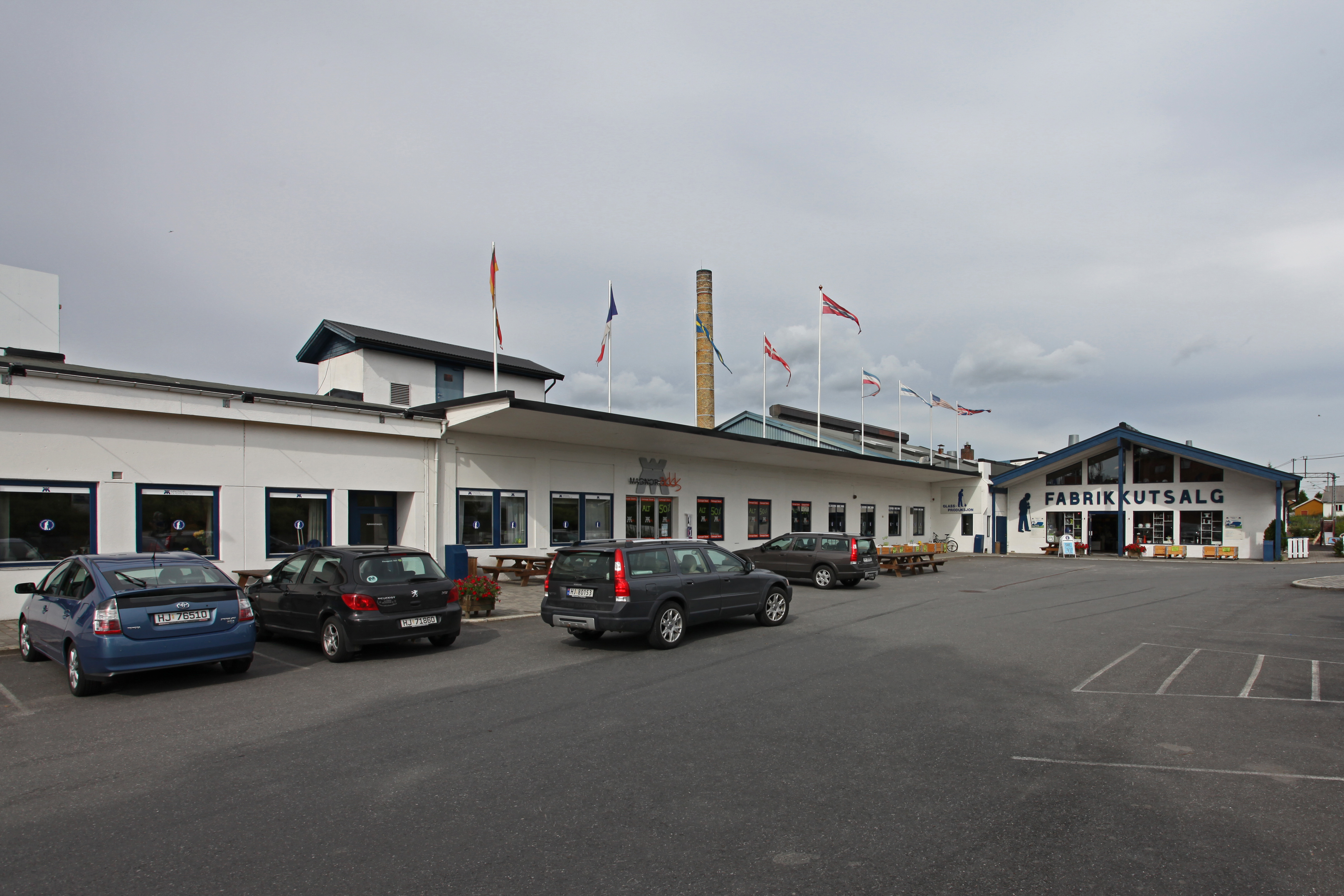
Magnor Glassverk exterior view

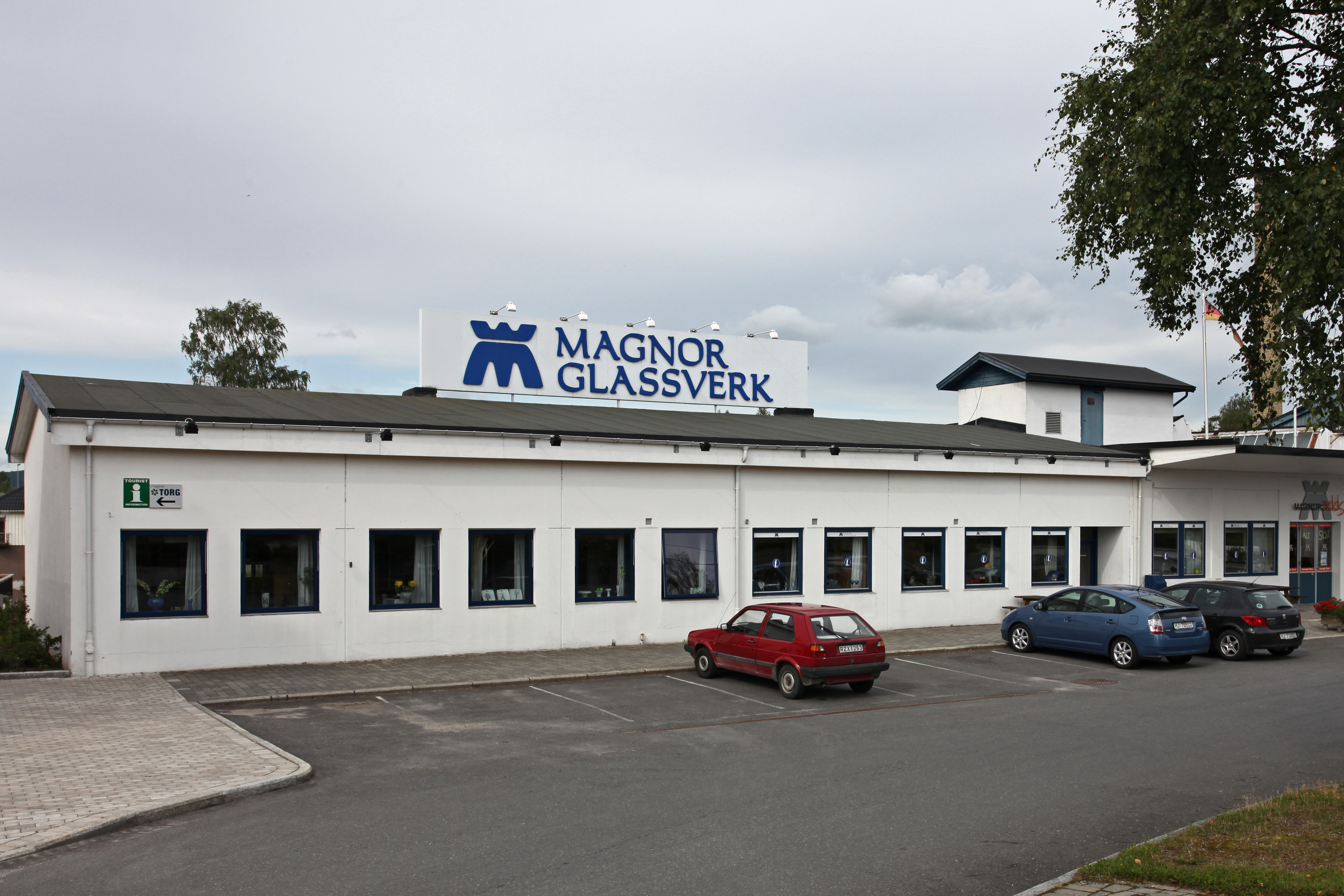
Magnor Glassverk exterior view

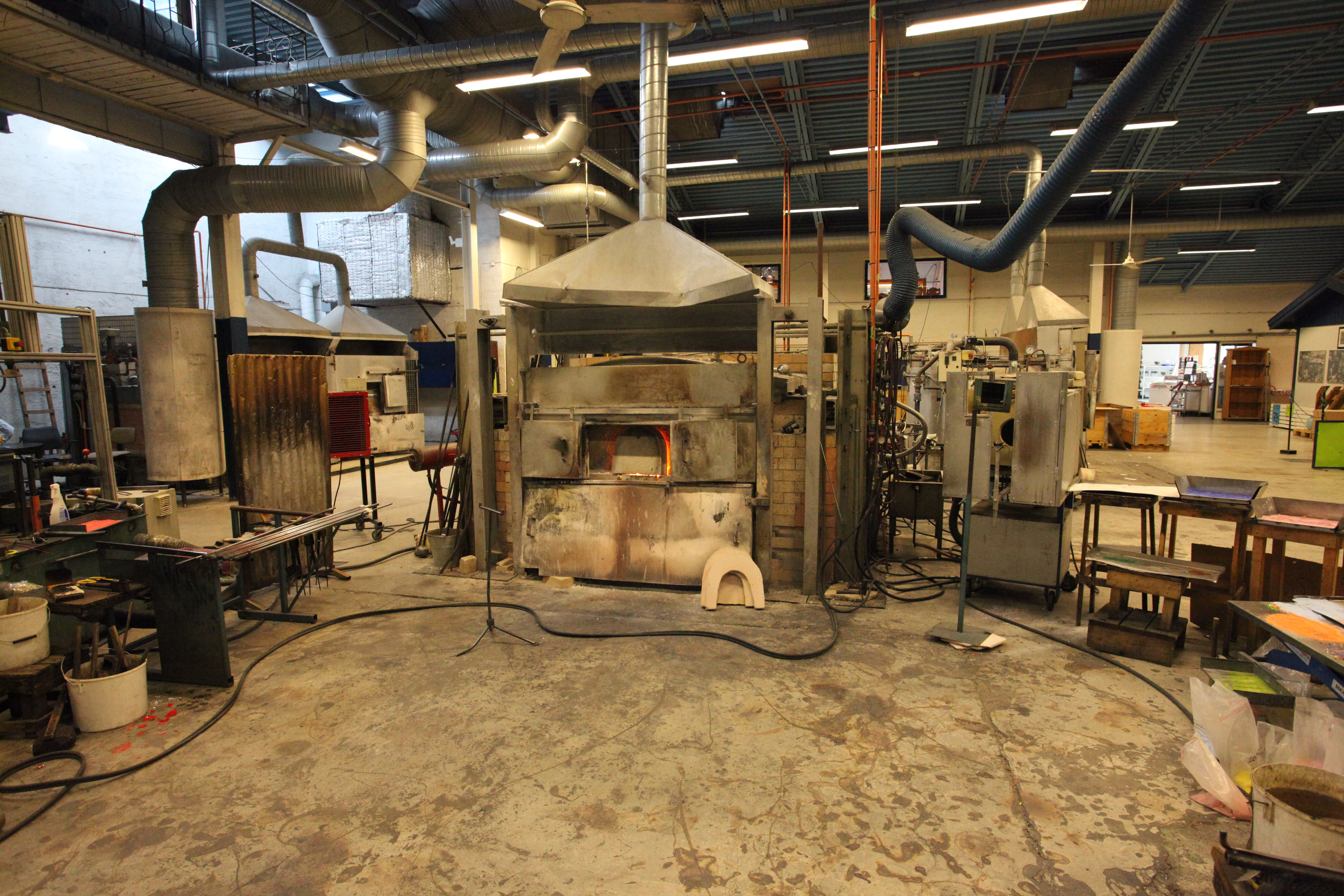
Magnor Glassverk furnaces
