= Libbey Incorporated =

American glass company

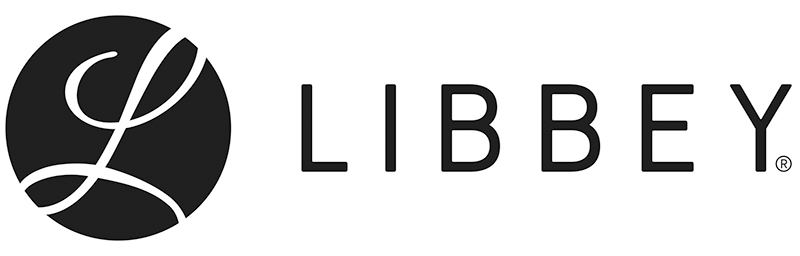
- Formerly: New England Glass Company; Libbey Glass Company; Libbey-Owens-Ford
- Type: Private
- ISIN: US5298981086
- Industry: Glassware manufacturing
- Founded: February 6, 1818; 208 years ago
- Founder: Edward Drummond Libbey
- Headquarters: 300 Madison Avenue, Toledo, Ohio, United States
- Number of locations: 7 facilities, including headquarters (FY 2018)
- Key people: Michael P. Bauer (CEO); Jim Burmeister (COO); Mike Lindsey (CFO)
- Brands: Libbey; Crisal; Royal Leerdam; Lunita; Santa Elenita; Pyrorey; Spiegelau; Nachtmann; Viva Scandinavia; Syracuse China; World Tableware; Schonwald Germany; Playground
- Revenue: ▲US$797.9 million; (FY 2018)
- Operating income: ▲US$28.749 million; (FY 2018)
- Net income: ▼US(7,956) million; (FY 2018)
- Total assets: ▲US$317,668 million; (FY 2018)
- Number of employees: 6,083 (FY 2018)
- Website: https://libbey.com

Libbey, Inc., (formerly Libbey Glass Company and New England Glass Company) is a glass production company headquartered in Toledo, Ohio. It was originally founded in 1818 in Cambridge, Massachusetts, as the New England Glass Company, before relocating to Ohio in 1888 and renaming to Libbey Glass Co. After it was purchased in 1935, it operated as part of the Libbey-Owens-Ford company and as a division of the Owens-Illinois glass company until 1993, when it was separated back into an independent company.

The company manufactures a number of glassware products, primarily tableware, drinkware and stemware. Historically, it was also involved in producing other types of glass products, such as automotive glass, glass drinking bottles, and light bulbs.

== History ==
=== New England Glass Company (1818–1892) ===
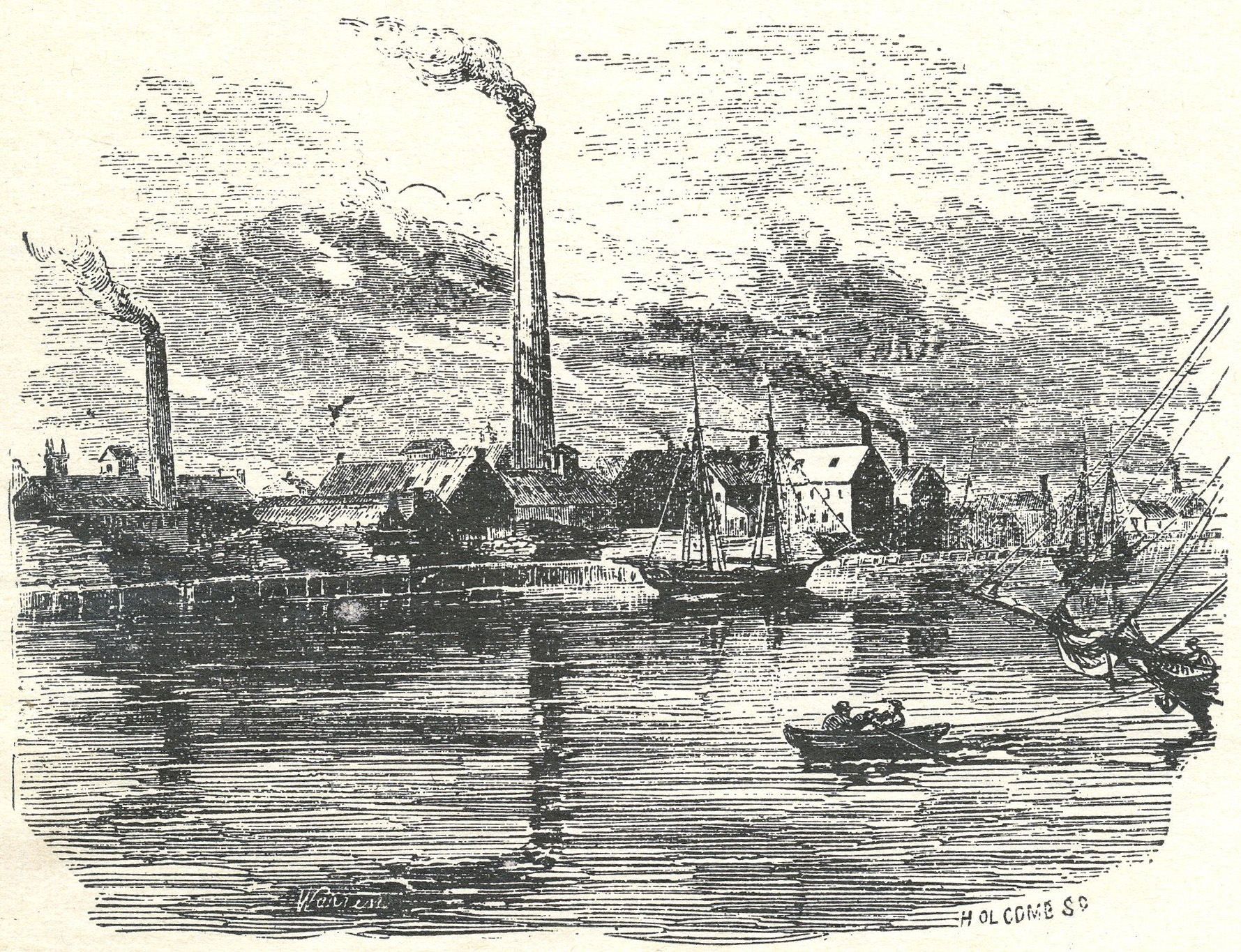
Exterior view of the New England Glass Company from the east, c. 1855

The New England Glass Company was originally founded in Cambridge, Massachusetts, by Amos Binney, Edmund Munroe, Daniel Hastings, and Deming Jarves on February 16, 1818. The company produced both blown and pressed glass objects in a variety of colors, which had engraved, cut, etched, and gilded decorations. The firm was one of the first glass companies to use a steam engine to operate its cutting machines, and it built the only oven in the country that could manufacture red lead, a key ingredient in the making of so-called flint glass. By the middle of the nineteenth century, the New England Glass Company was considered one of the leading glasshouses in the United States, best known for its cut and engraved glass.

At its start, the company occupied a disused East Cambridge warehouse erected by the recently failed Boston Porcelain and Glass Company. It was fitted with two flint furnaces, 24 steam-operated glass-cutting mills, and a red-lead furnace, which in combination could produce many types of plain, molded, and cut glass. The company charter permitted it to manufacture "flint and crown glass of all kinds in the towns of Boston and Cambridge." At that time, about 40 glass factories existed in the United States, though most had few employees. Deming Jarves held one key advantage over his competitors in the glass manufacturing business; he held the American monopoly on red lead (litharge), which was essential for the production of fine lead glass. In 1826, however, Jarves left to found the Boston and Sandwich Glass Company.

Through the 1820s, the company exhibited at the American Institute Fair, won a Franklin Institute award for "skill and ingenuity," and established agencies in New York, Philadelphia, and Baltimore. The company took full advantage of the introduction of pressed glass and its business grew rapidly. Within 25 years, the glass industry was Cambridge's top employer in 1845 and again in 1855, when two companies, New England and Bay State, each employed more than 500 people. Engraver Louis F. Vaupel (1824–1903), who joined New England Glass in 1856, led its creation in the 1860s and 1870s of high-quality cut and engraved products, including very fine paperweights.

The company flourished as one of America's leading glass manufacturers through the Civil War, but the development of inexpensive soda-lime glass in West Virginia brought a deep decline in sales, which dropped from about $500,000 in 1865 to $232,304 in 1876, when the workforce had been reduced to only 200 laborers. In 1877, the company's directors withdrew from active participation, leasing the property to William Libbey, their agent since 1870.

William L. Libbey took over the company in 1878 and renamed it the New England Glass Works, Wm. L. Libbey & Sons Props. In 1888, William's son, Edward Drummond Libbey, moved the company to Toledo, Ohio.

=== Libbey Glass Company (1892–1935) ===
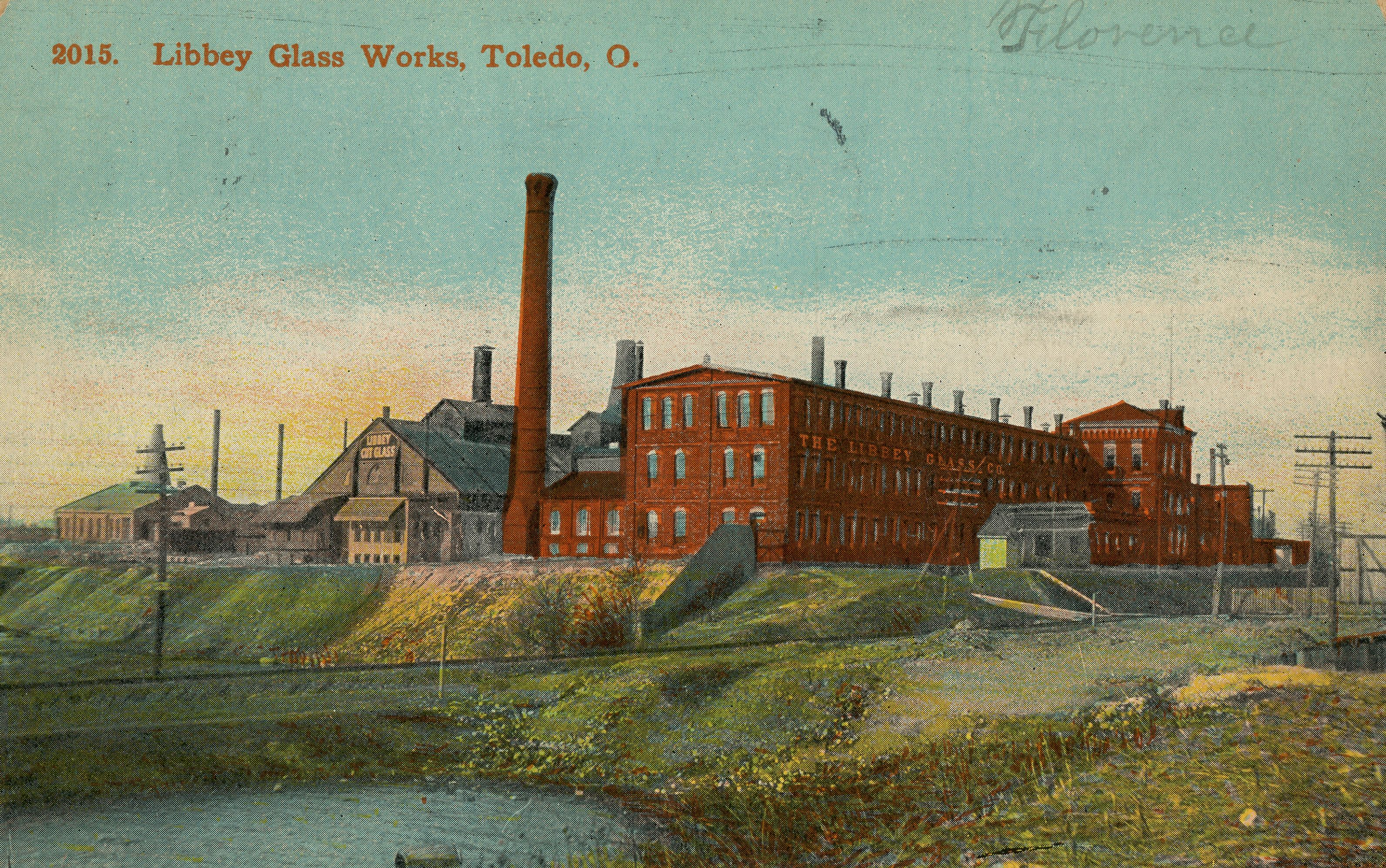
Libbey Glass Works, Toledo, Ohio, 1912

The company's name was changed to The Libbey Glass Company in 1892. In the 1890s, Libbey Glass employee Michael Joseph Owens created an experimental semiautomatic glass-blowing machine. Owens' contributions to the automation methods in the glass and bottling industries spread throughout the United States as the popularity of bottled drinks (and glass products as a whole) became more popular and cheaper to produce in the coming decades. In the late 19th and early 20th century, Libbey Glass Company produced cut glass in the brilliant style. They won a gold medal for their cut glass at the 1904 St. Louis World's Fair. In 1920, the company reorganized as the Libbey Glass Manufacturing Company, and Libbey gave up his controlling interest in the firm.

=== Libbey Glass Division, Owens-Illinois (1935–1993) ===
Libbey Glass Company was acquired by Owens-Illinois Glass Company in 1935, after experiencing financial difficulties during the Great Depression. Under Owens-Illinois, Libbey Glass Company ended its production of fine, handcrafted cut glass and focused on selling mass-produced glass for a broad consumer base. This shift led to an increase in financial success.

=== Libbey Inc. (1993–present) ===
In April 1993, Owens-Illinois announced that it would sell the Libbey Glass division for an estimated $225 million. The sale was viewed as a negative sign for the industry, as earlier that year the Libbey-Owens-Ford Co. had considered (but ultimately decided against) moving its headquarters to Monroe, Michigan, while Toledo was still struggling to maintain its status as a significant glass exporter. Libbey would be spun off as an independent company, and would make its initial public offering on the New York Stock Exchange in June 1993.

The company marked its 200th anniversary in 2018. In April that year, the Toledo Museum of Art featured a variety of glass artwork from its collection, all produced by Libbey over several decades. The company also hosted an invitation-only event in May that included performances from the Toledo Symphony Orchestra, as well as a public event at the museum.

In March 2019, Libbey announced that it had hired Mike Bauer, the former president of Master Lock Company, to replace Bill Foley as chief executive officer. Foley would retire, but remain as a board chairman.

In June 2020, Libbey announced plans to file for Chapter 11 bankruptcy protection as the result of negative financial effects caused by the COVID-19 pandemic. Prior to the announcement, Libbey had awarded a total of over $3 million in bonuses to its executive staff in an attempt to dissuade them from leaving the company, after having temporarily decreased their pay by 20–25%. This was done in addition to furloughing approximately 50% of its North American workforce and suspending 401(k) matching, among other cost-saving measures. In October 2020, Libbey emerged from Chapter 11. In December 2020, Libbey closed its Shreveport plant putting 450 employees out of work.

== Galleries ==
=== New England Glass Company ===
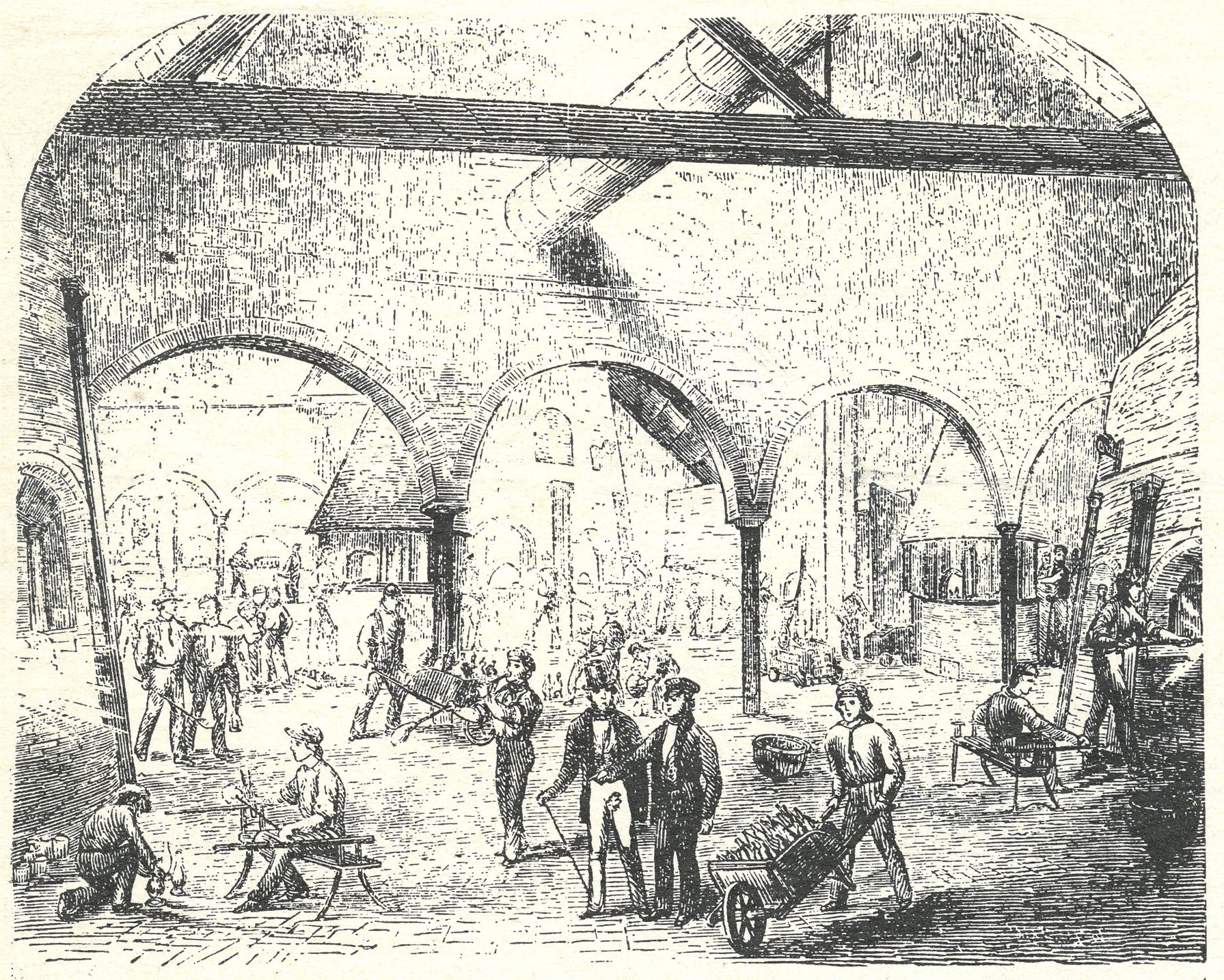
The glassblowing department of the New England Glass Company, c. 1855

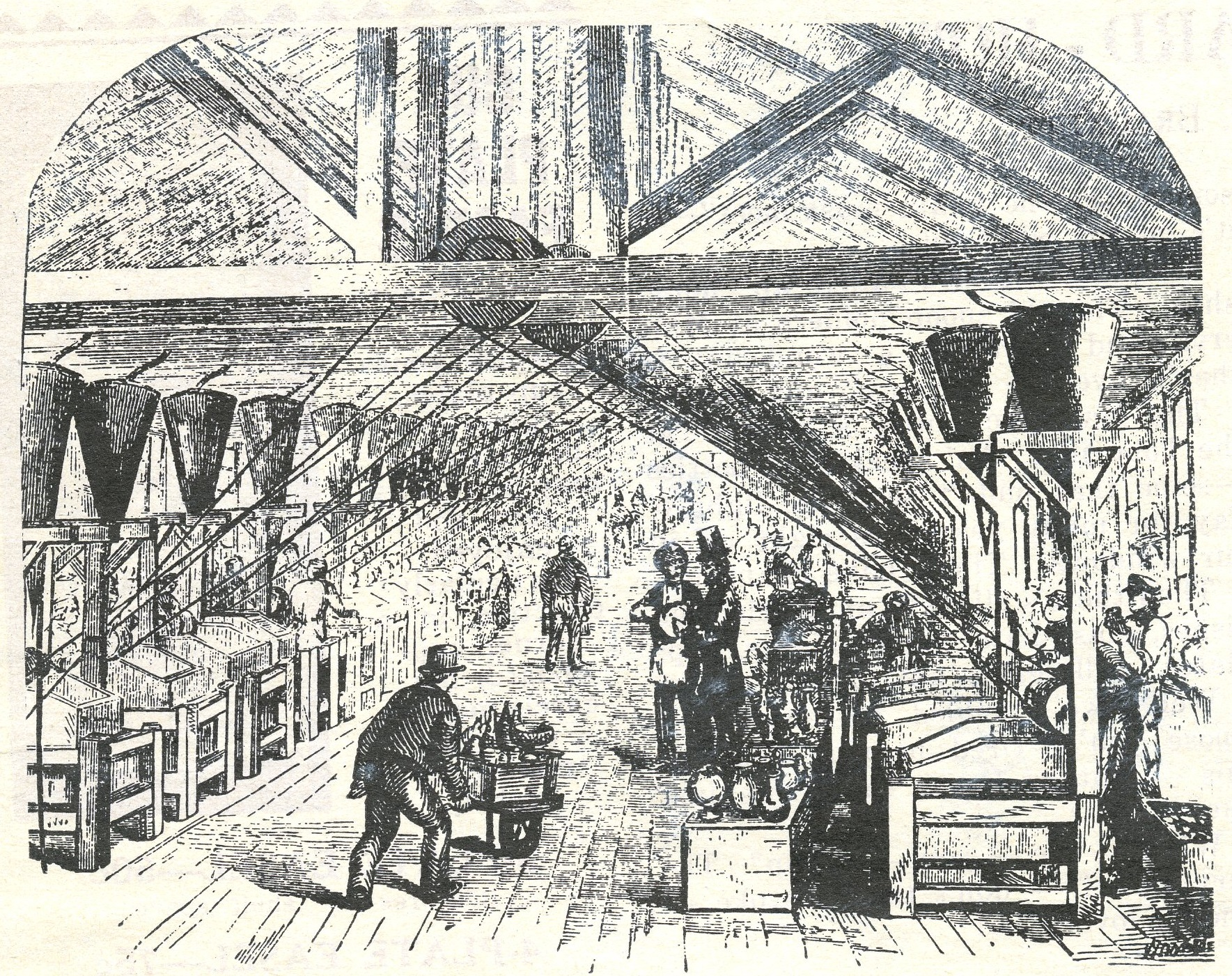
Glass-cutting room of the New England Glass Company, c. 1855

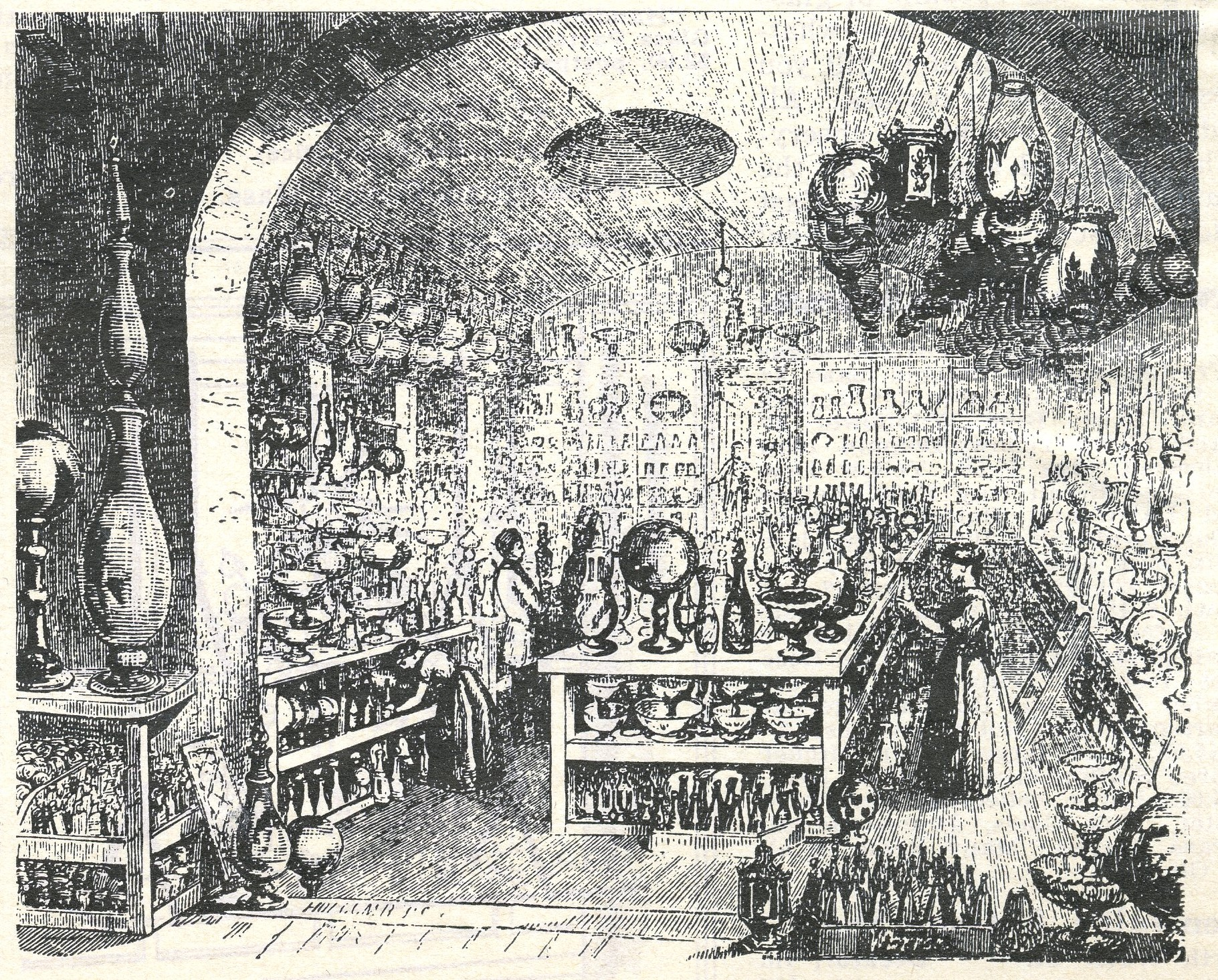
Showroom of the New England Glass Company, c. 1855

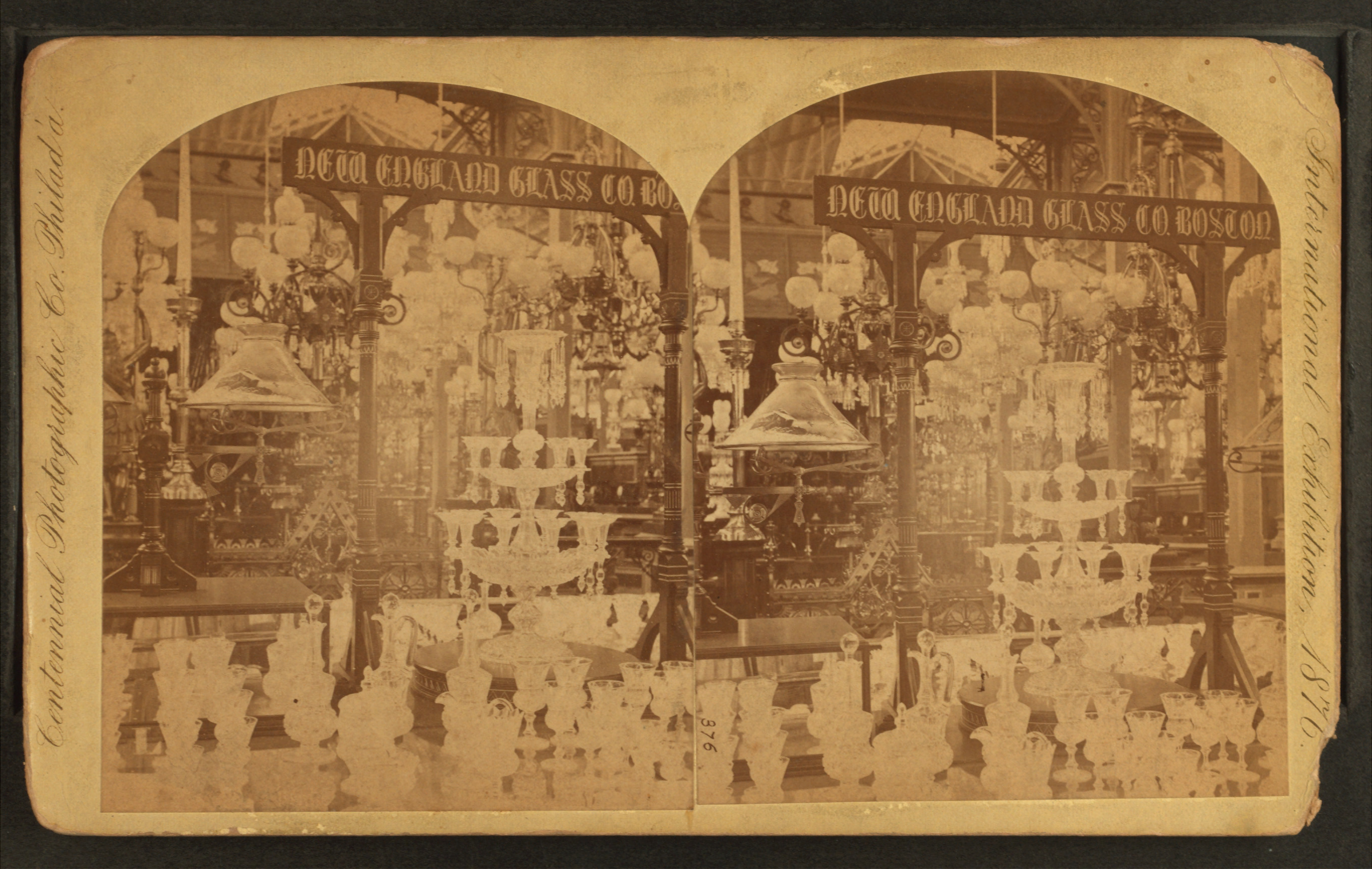
Display of New England Glass Co., 1876

=== Products ===
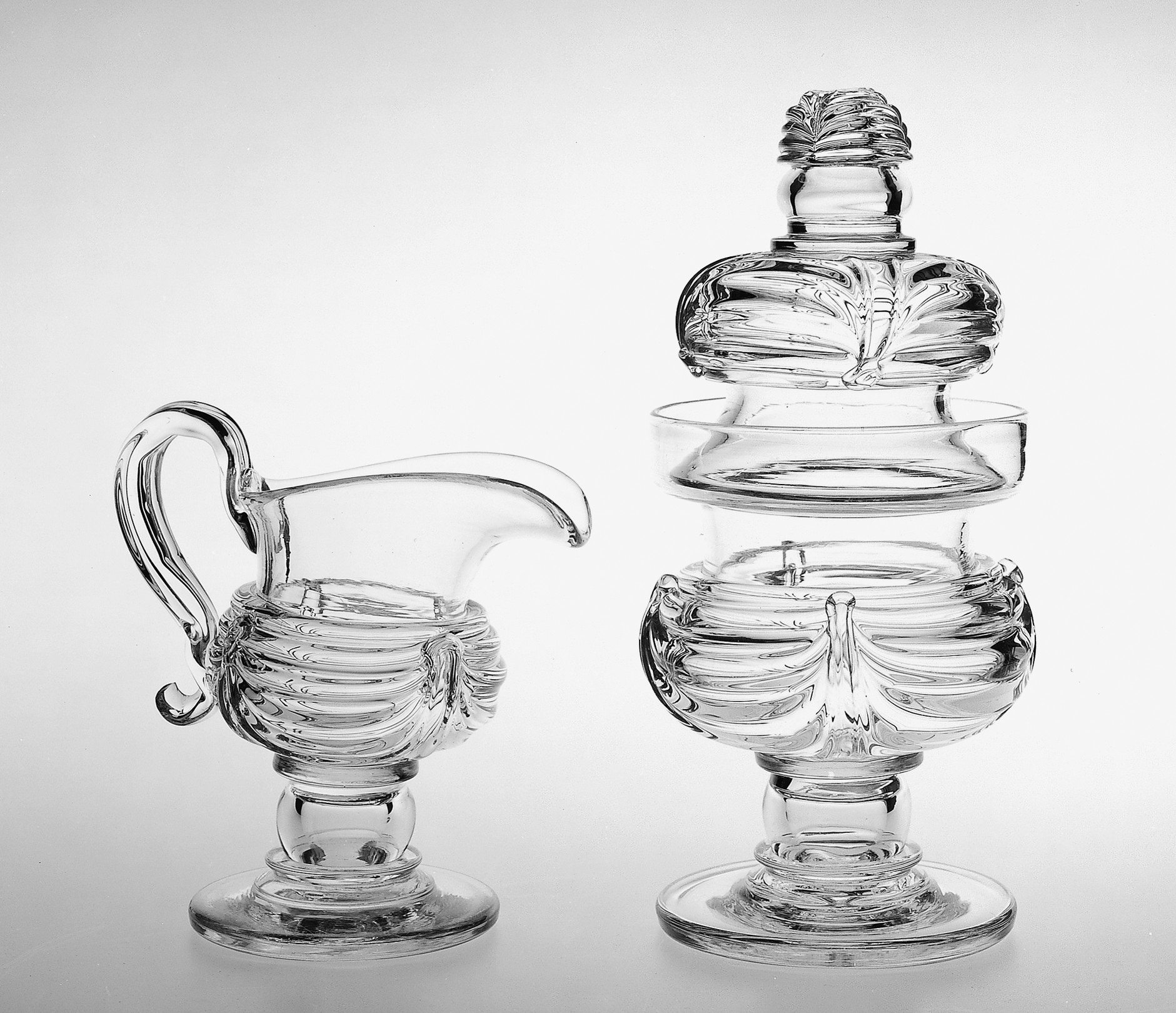
Sugar bowl and cream pitcher, free-blown glass with applied decoration, 1815–1835

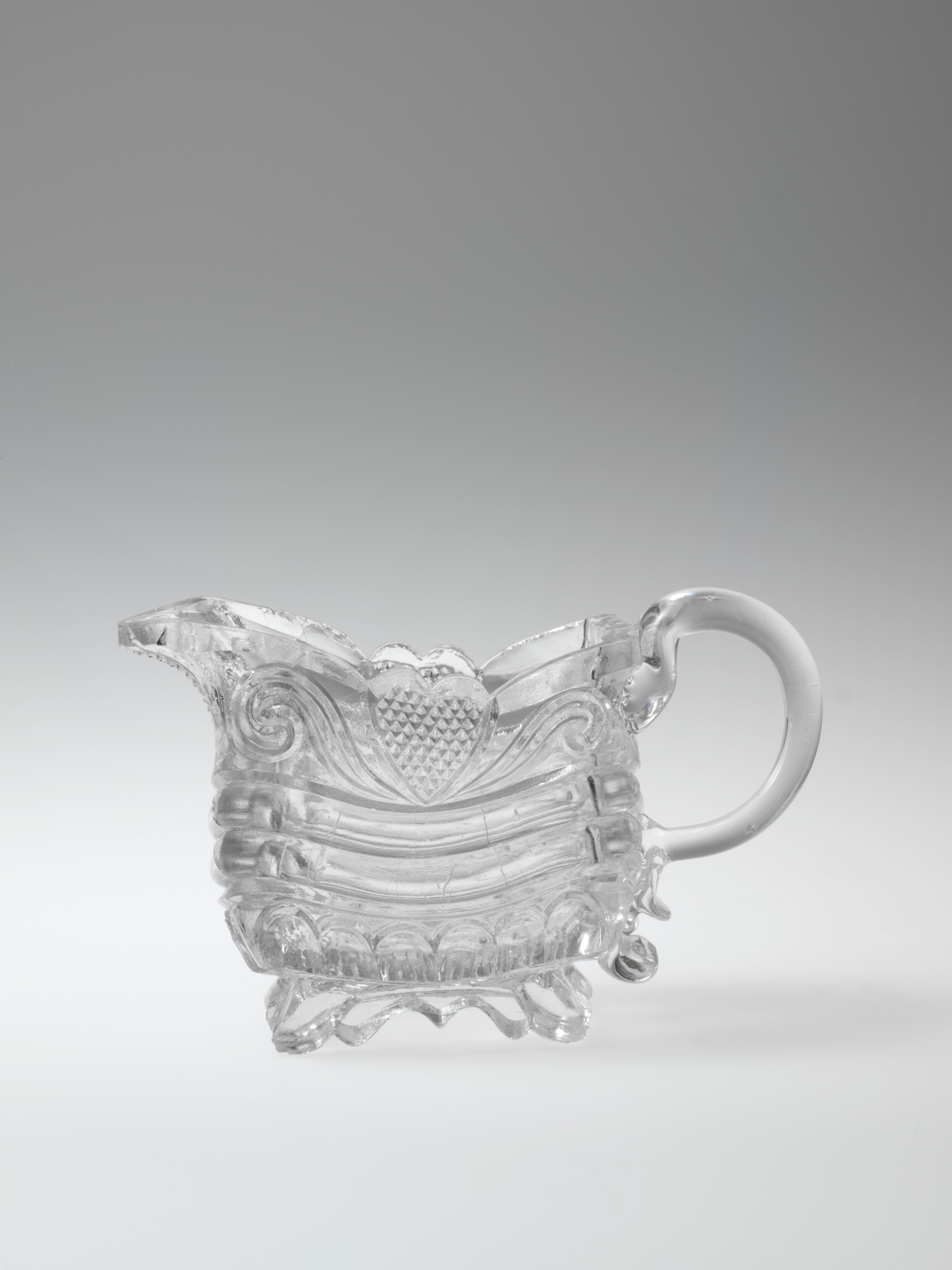
Cream pitcher, pressed glass, 1827–35

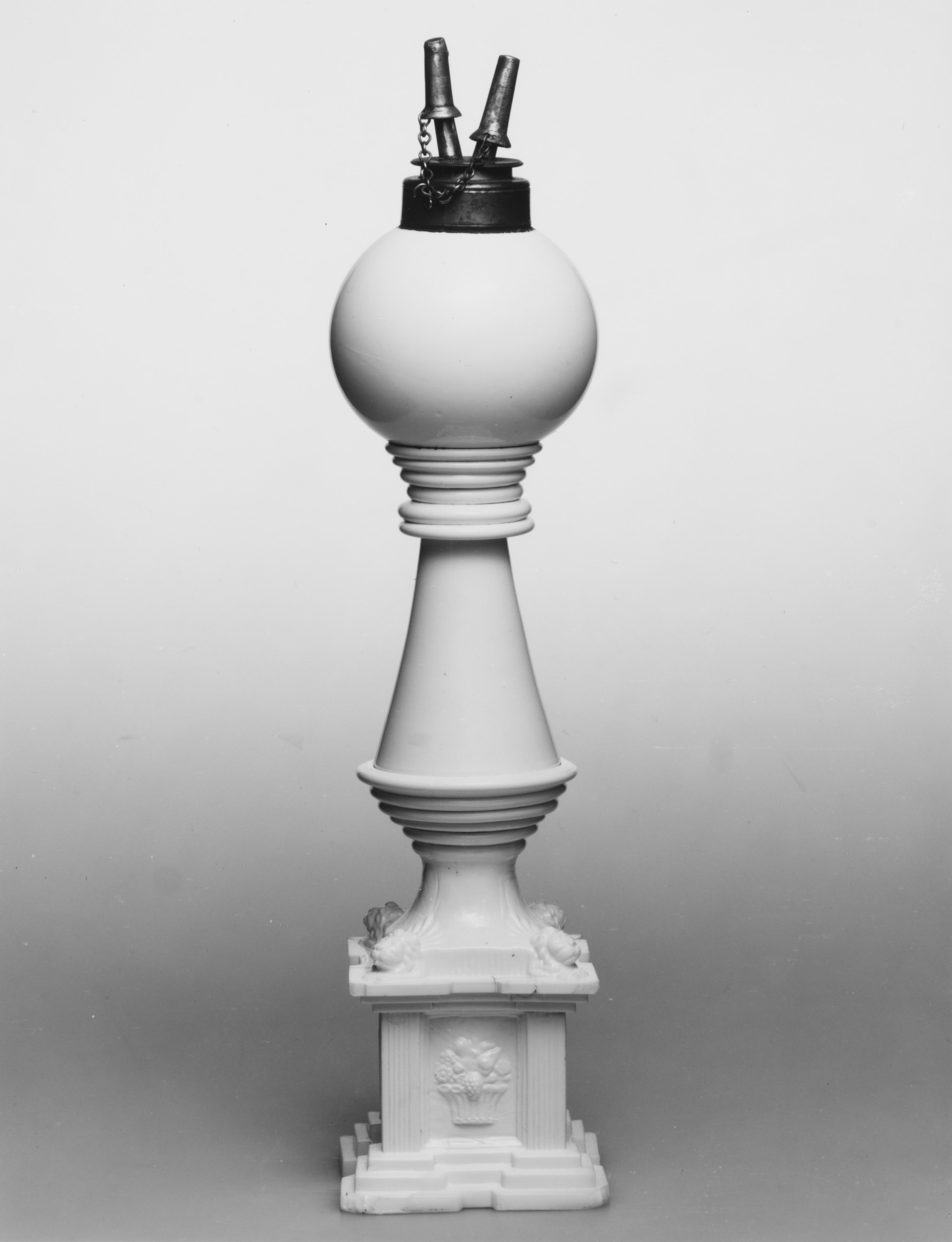
Oil Lamp, pressed and free-blown white opaque glass, 1830–1840

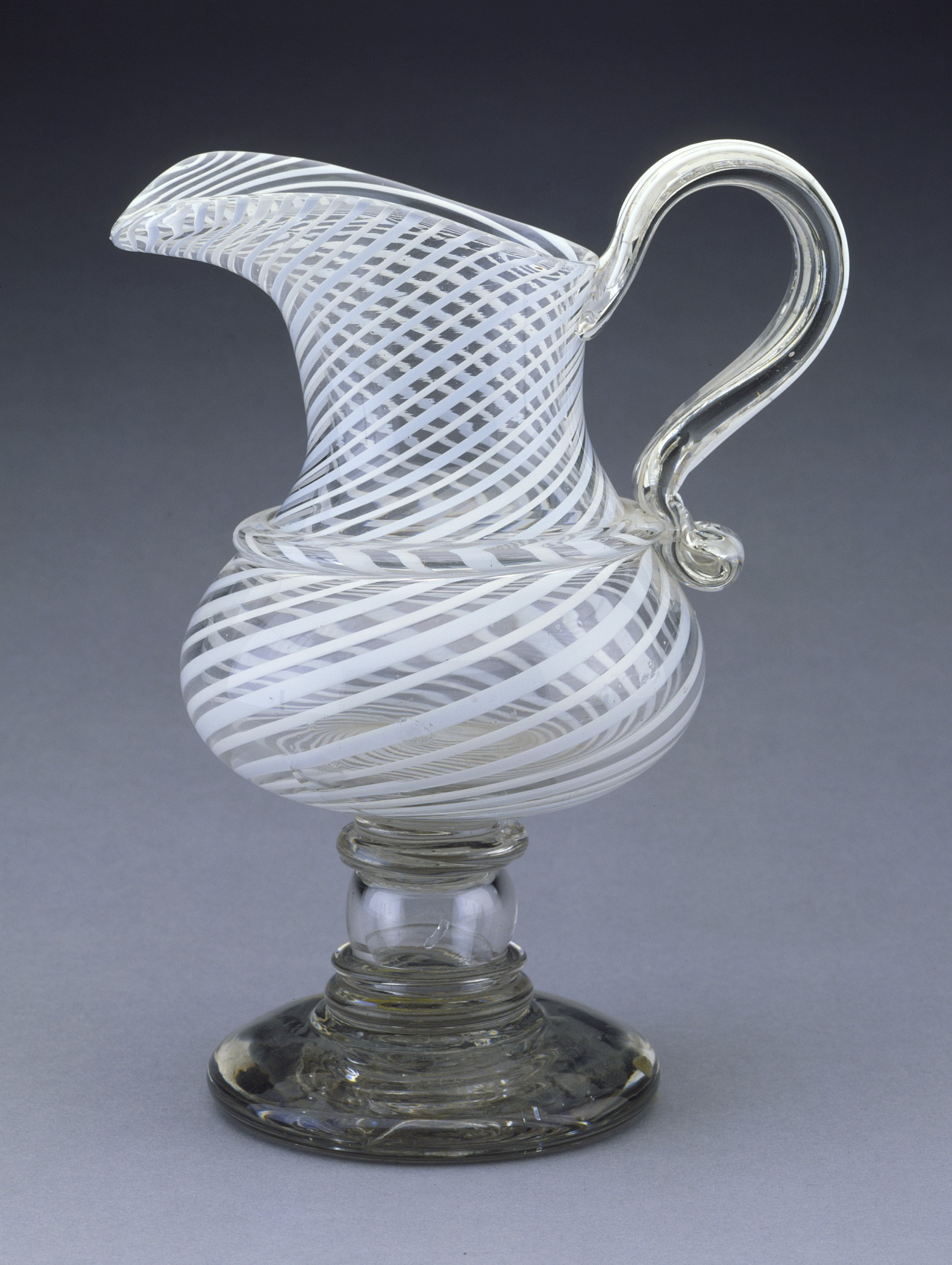
New England Glass Company ewer, 1840–1860

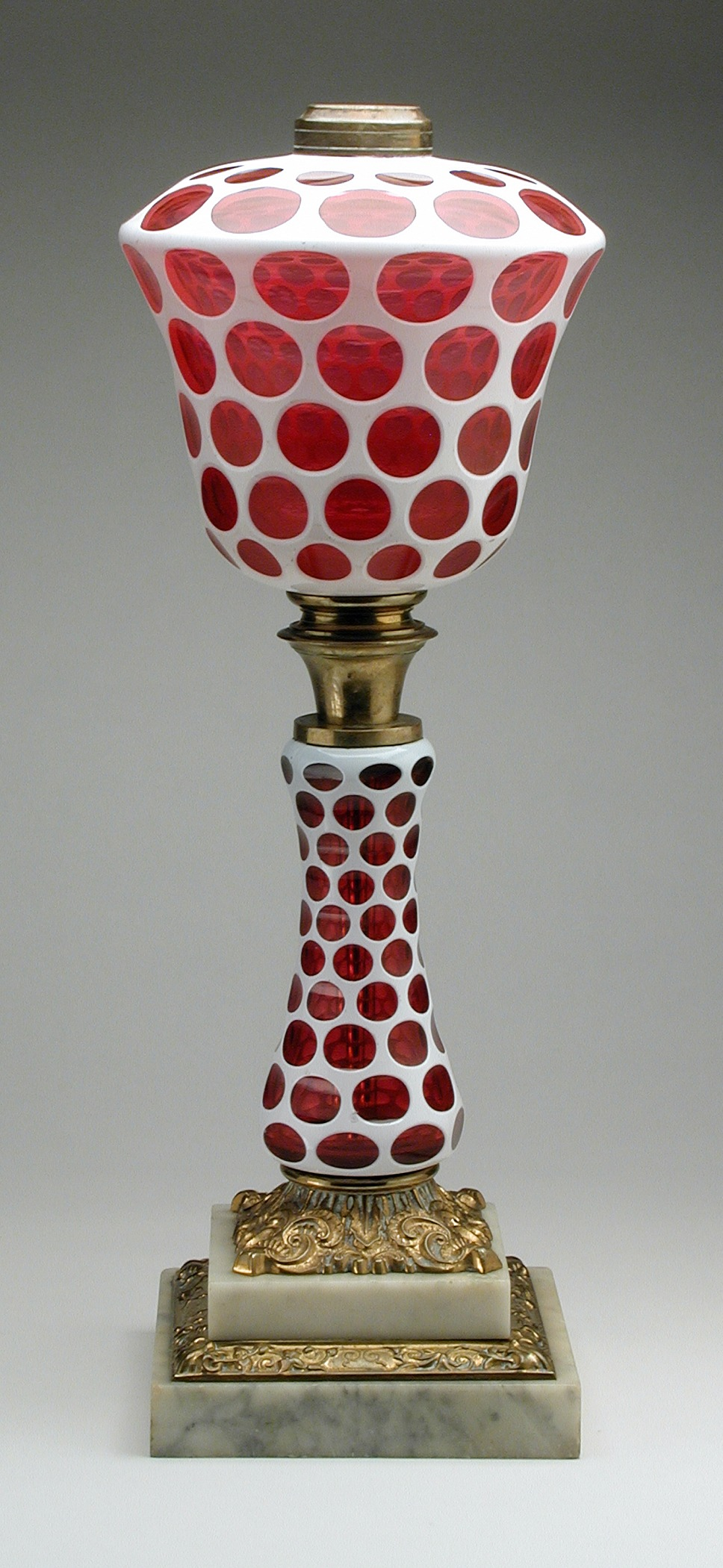
Kerosene Table Lamp, ca. 1850

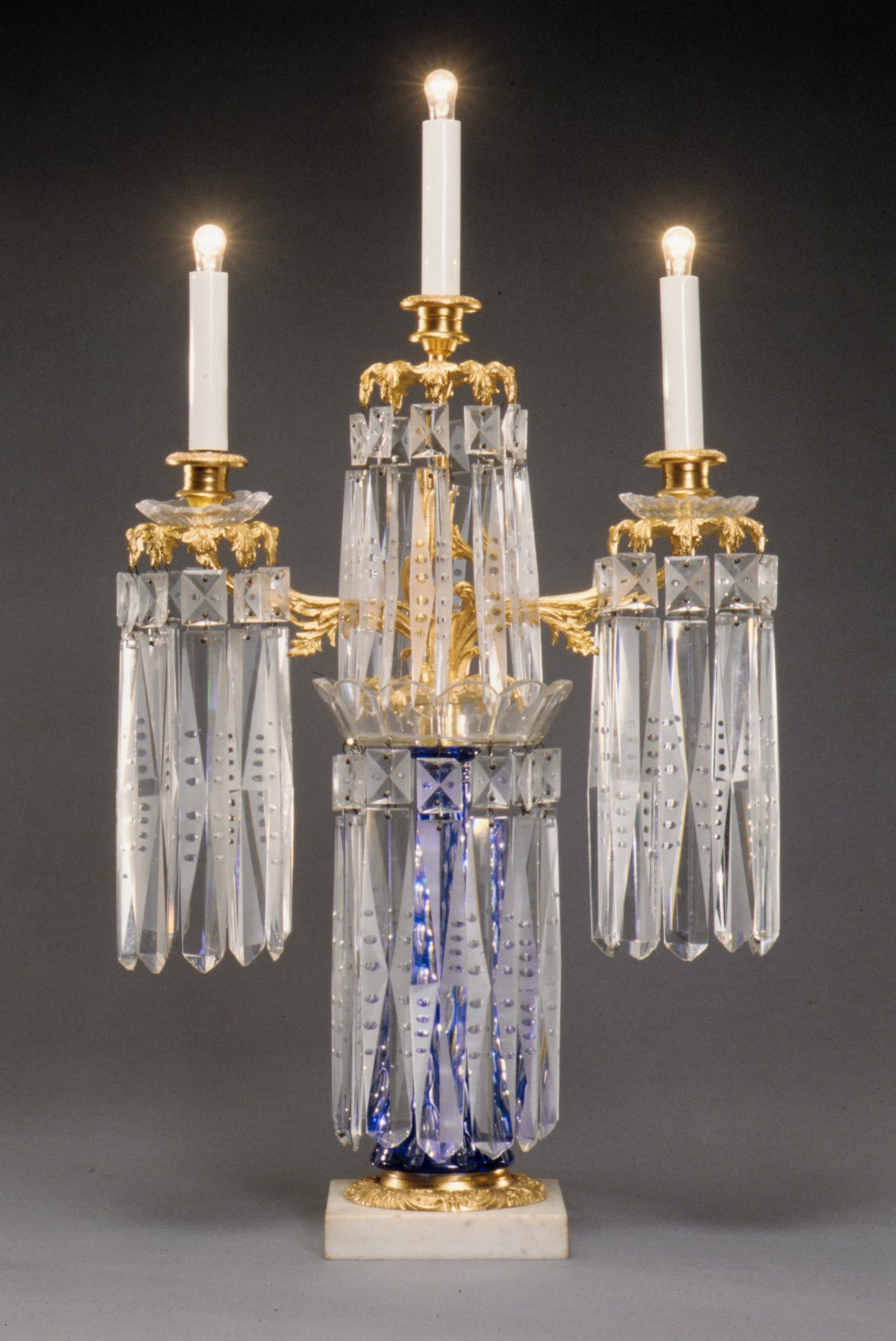
Girandole, cased and cut blown and engraved glass, 1850–1860

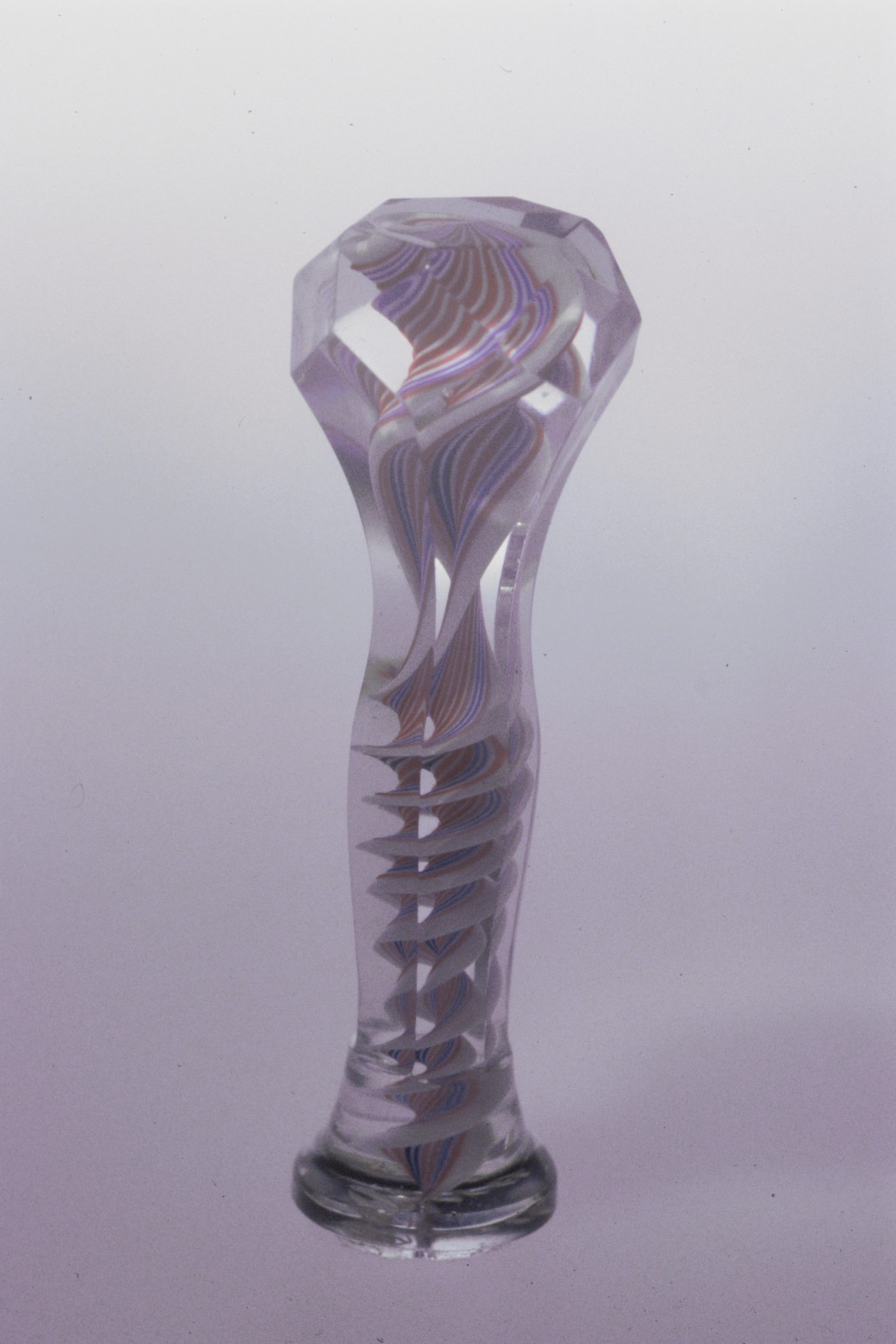
Seal, 1850–1870

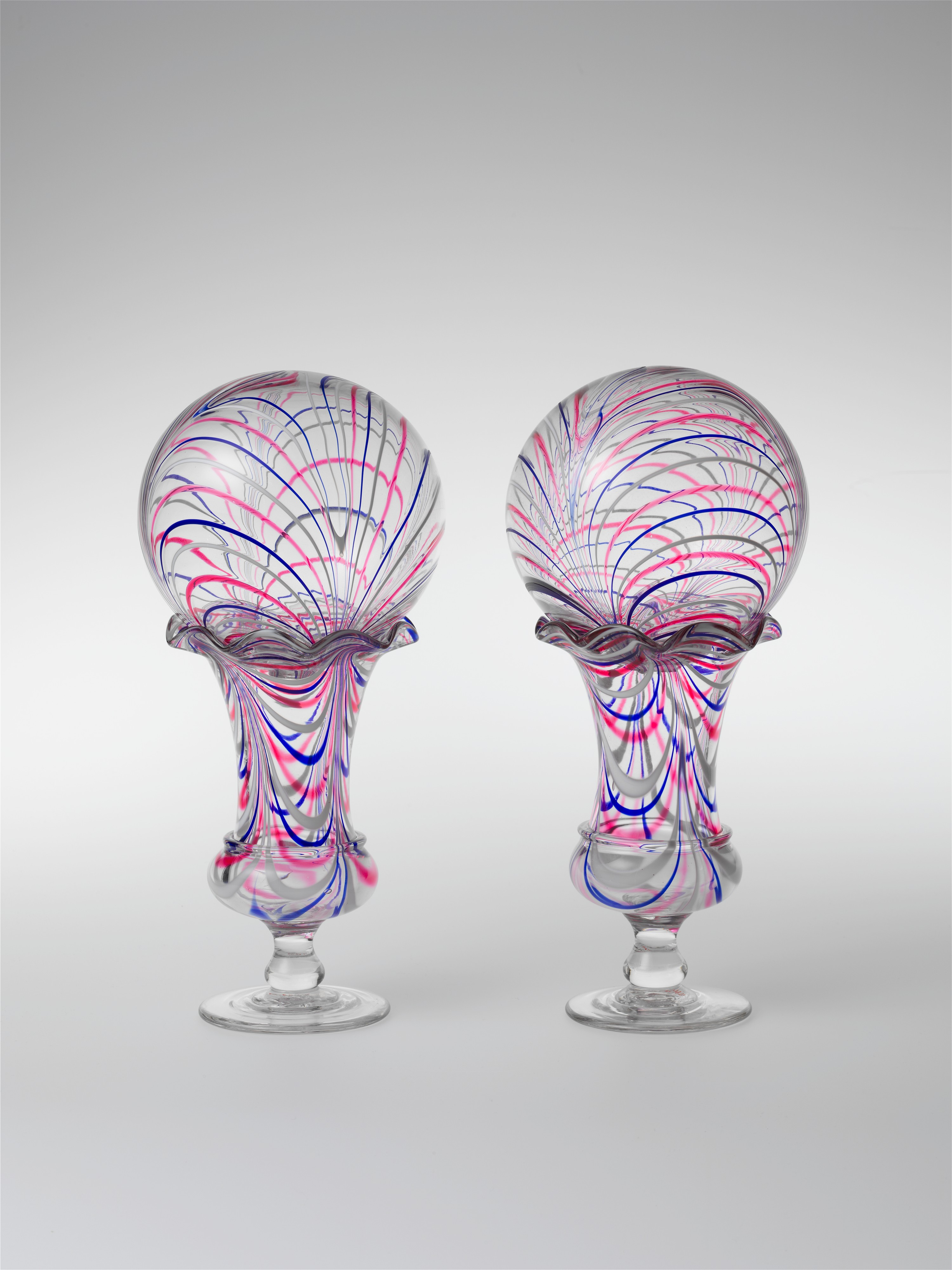
Vase with witch ball, blown glass, 1850–1875

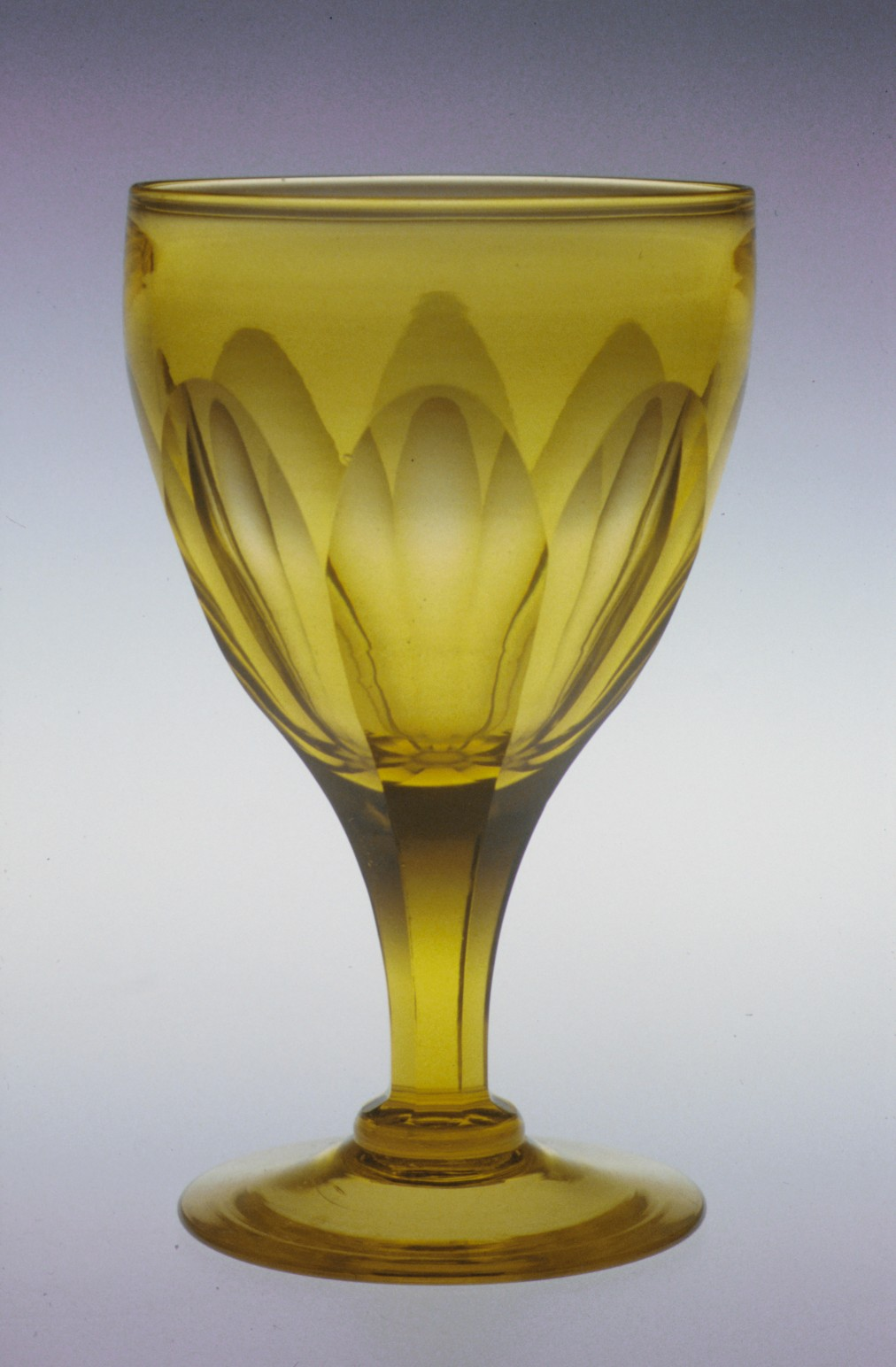
Wine glass, blown glass, 1850–80

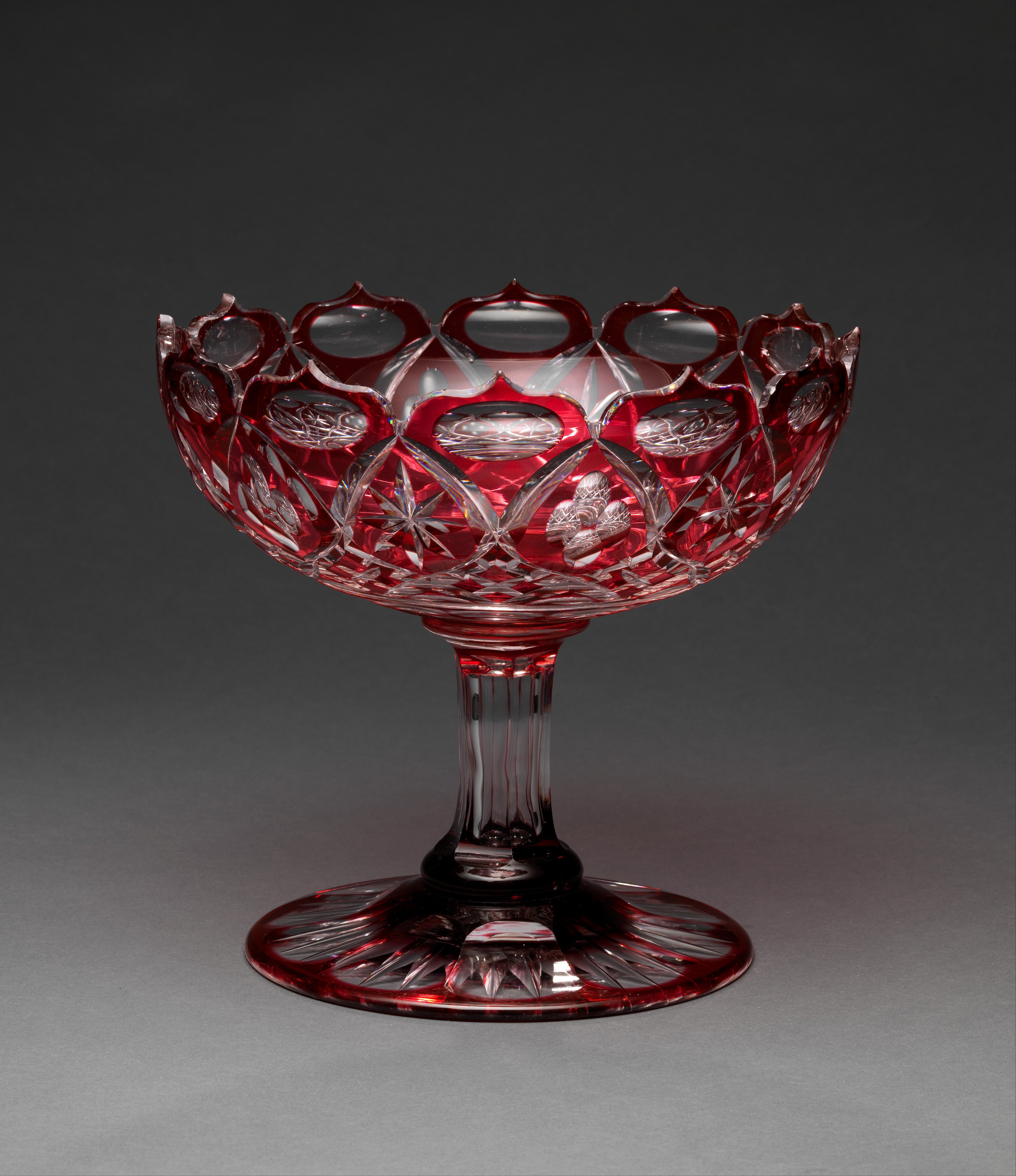
Compote, red-cut-to-clear-glass, 1855–70

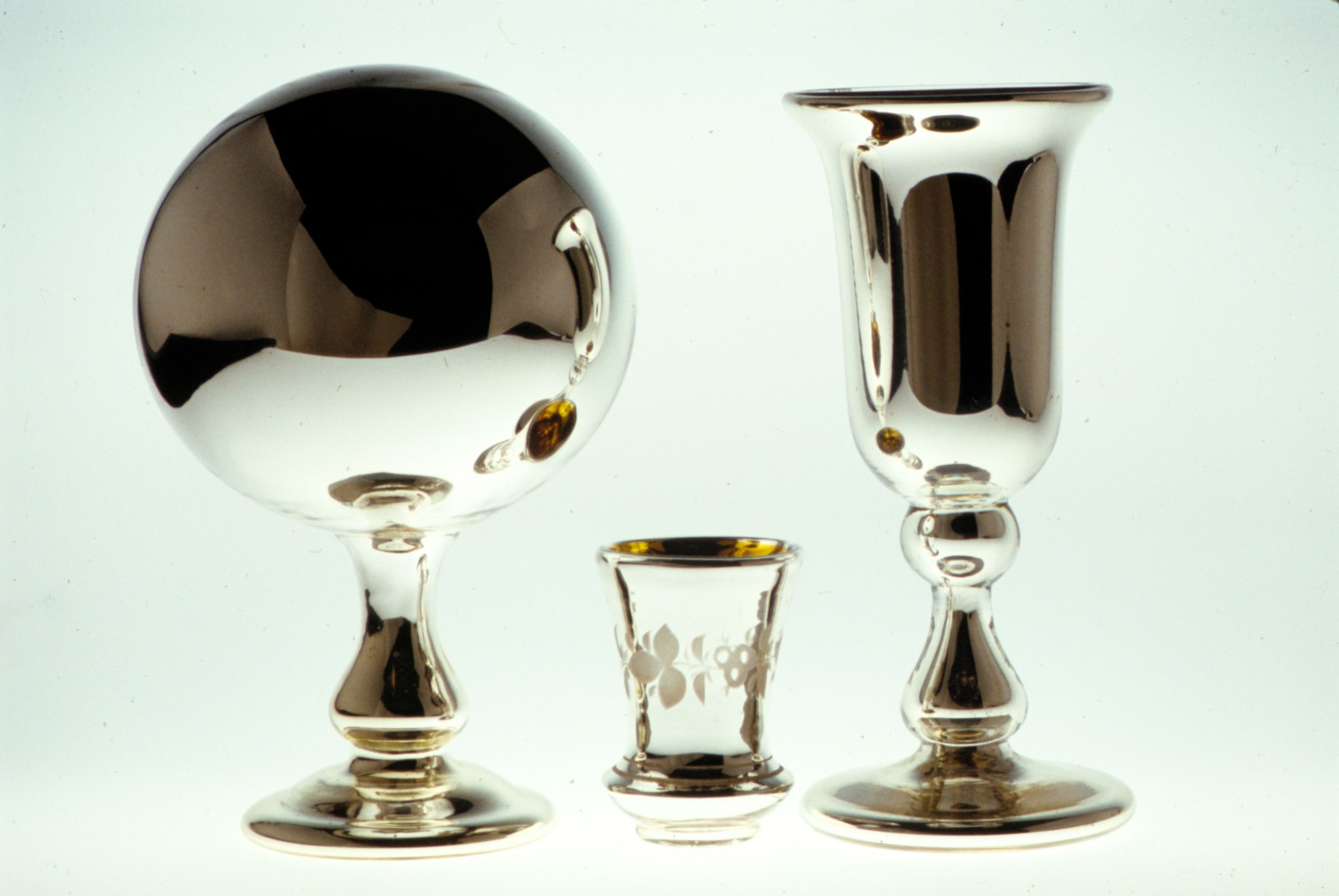
Hat stand, free-blown silvered glass, 1855–1875

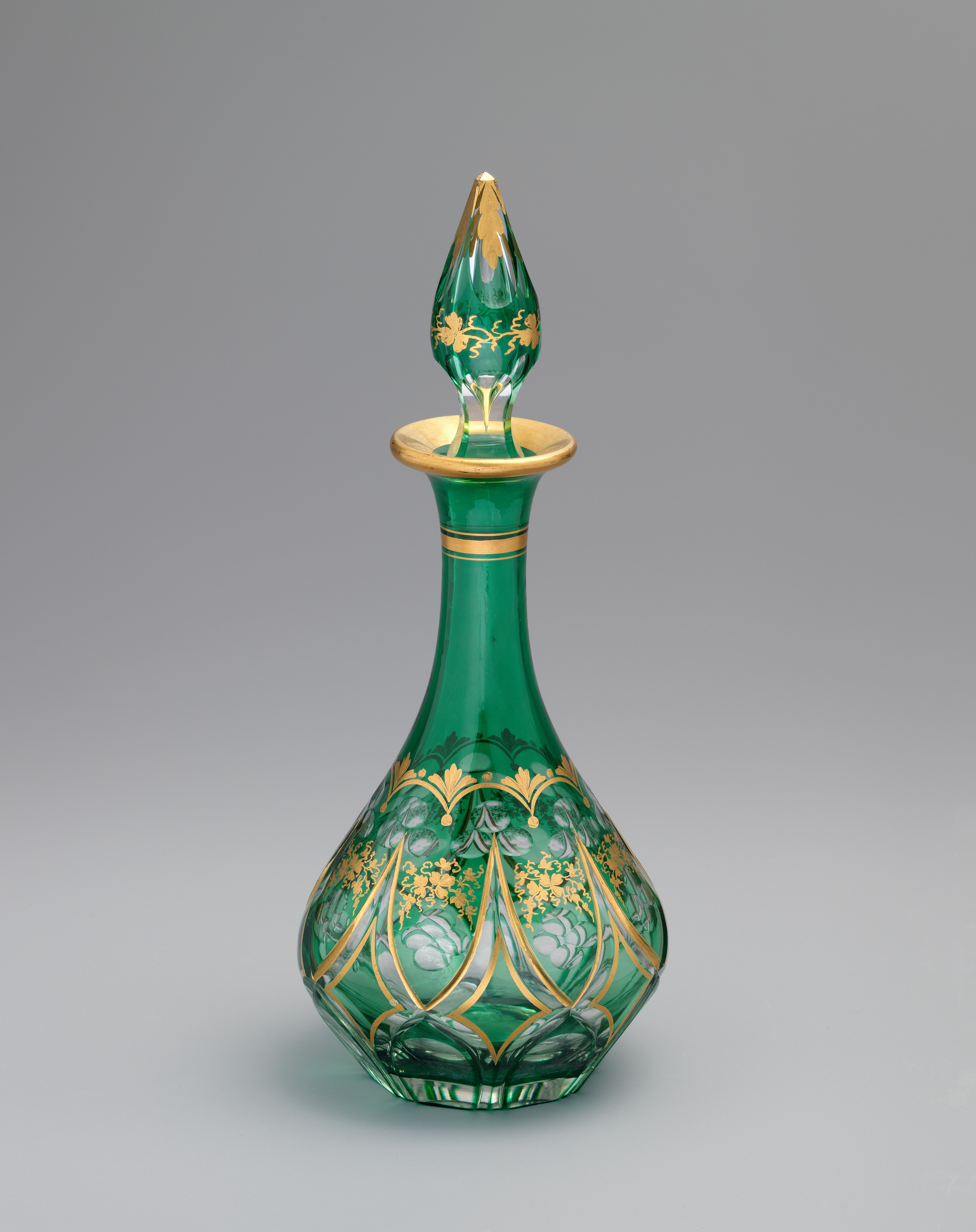
Perfume decanter, green cased over colorless lead glass, 1866–70

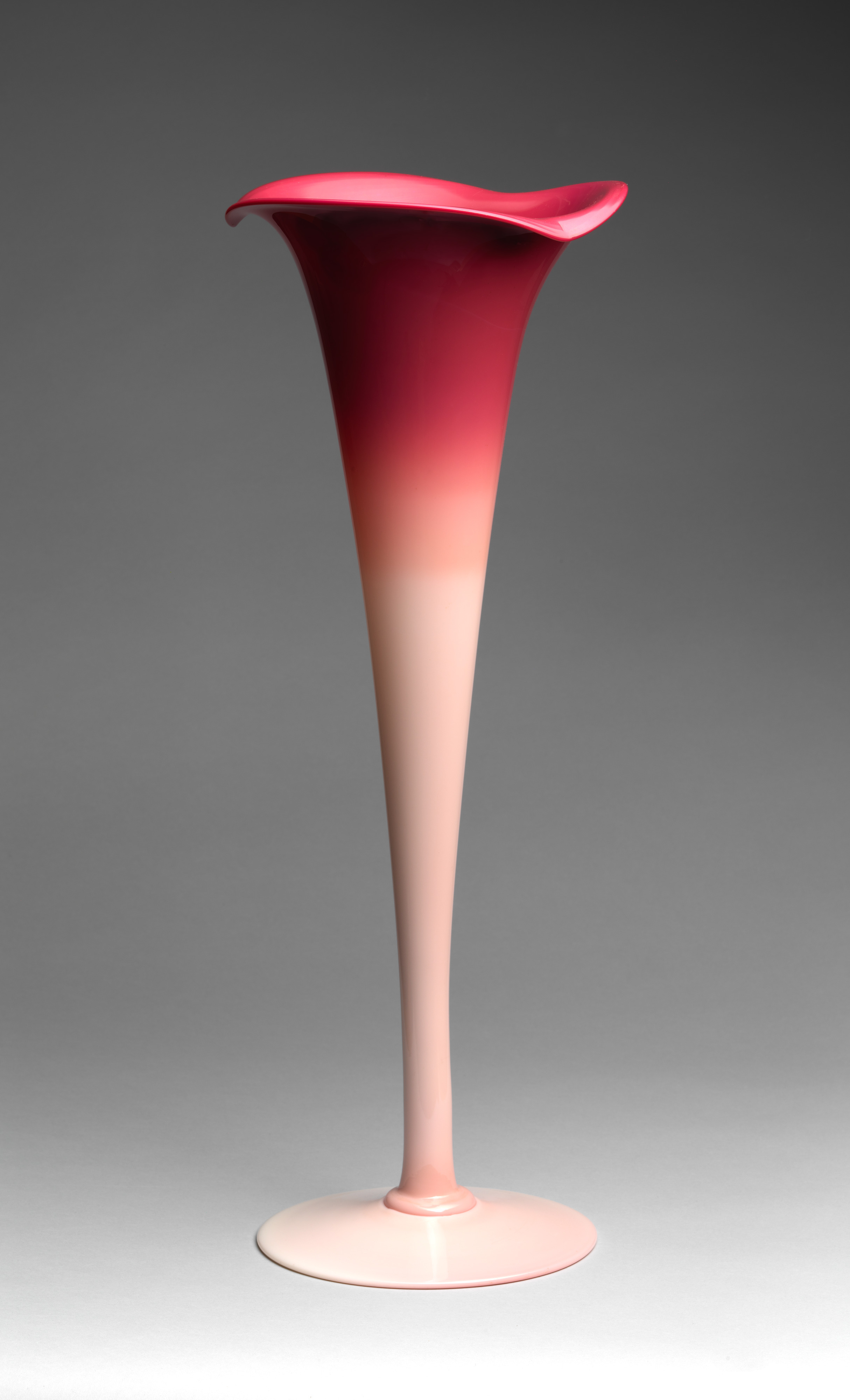
"Wild Rose" Lily vase, blown glass, ca. 1886

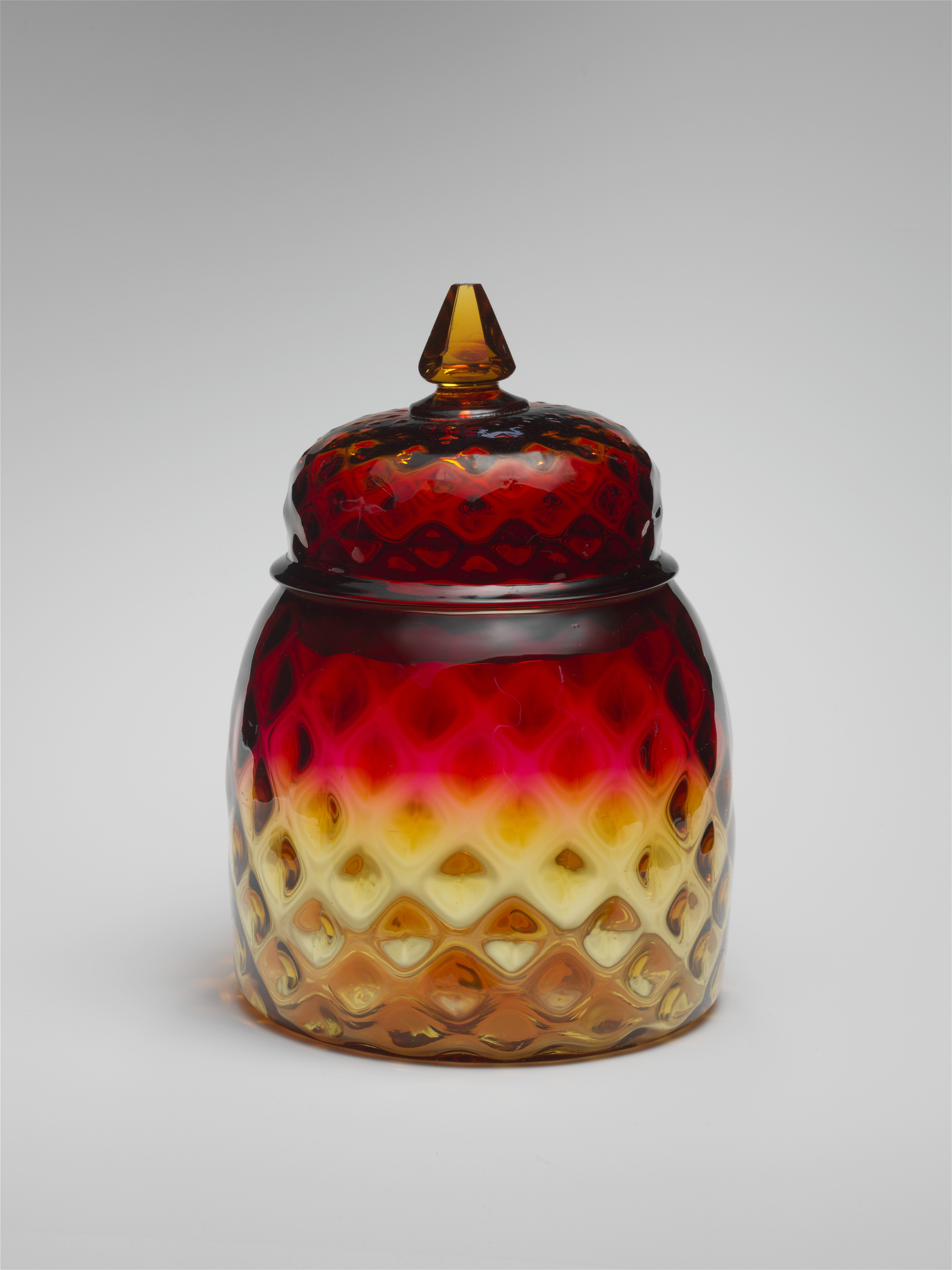
Covered jar, blown Amberina glass, 1883–1888
