= Millersburg Glass Company =

Defunct glassmaking company in Ohio, US

The Millersburg Glass Company was started in 1908 by John W Fenton in Millersburg, OH.

== History ==
In early 1908 John W. Fenton left the Fenton Art Glass Company after a falling-out with his brother Frank Fenton. Though he remained on the Fenton board of directors. He had helped found Fenton Art Glass with his brother in 1905 .
The Millersburg factory was located in Millersburg, OH and was constructed quickly. The factory was state of the art for its day and opened in 1909. John was not the best businessman, he was more of a promoter. The factory was in an obscure location and the company folded in 1911. The company was sold to Samuel Fair and was reopened as the Radium Glass Company. This company only lasted one year and closed in 1912.

== Colors ==
The company is well known for its Carnival glass. Its first carnival color was Radium. It is known for its bright and shiny finish. The main colors made by Millerburg are green, amethyst, and marigold. They also made vaseline, blue, lavender, and aqua.

== Patterns ==
Millersburg often would develop patterns from those that they had made before. They also used different patterns on the inside and outside of a piece.

Name	Description	Reference
Acorn	A pattern used for compotes. Known colors include green, vaseline, amethyst, and marigold.	
Big Fish	A pattern that is close to the Trout and Fly pattern made by Millersburg. Made in bowl shapes in green, vaseline, amethyst, and marigold.	
Big Thistle	Only two known items have this patter. Both are punch bowls in the amethyst color	
Blackberry Wreath	Used on plates and bowls. Similar to Grape Wreath and Strawberry Wreath also made by Millersburg.	
Boutonniere	A six petal flower surrounded by striped rays. Used on compotes in green, vaseline, amethyst, and marigold colors.	
Bullseye and Loop	Used on vases. The vases are swung and the pattern is deformed.	
Butterfly and Corn	Outside pattern used on a vase. Colors include green, vaseline, amethyst, and marigold.	
Campbell and Beesley	Letters in the middle spelling out Campbell and Beesley. Found mostly on hand grip plates.	
Cherries	Also called Hanging Cherries because the cherries hang into the center of the plate or bowl.	
Cosmos	Only used on bowls in the color green.	
Country Kitchen	A geometric pattern with a ring of stars on the outer edge. The pattern was used on bowls and table items like butter dishes and creamers.	
