= Dugan Glass Company =

American manufacturing company (1905–1913)

- Founded: 1905; 120 years ago
- Founder: Thomas Dugan
- Defunct: 1913
- Successor: Diamond glass company
- Headquarters: Indiana, Pennsylvania, United States

The Dugan Glass Company was a decorative glass manufacturer based in Indiana, Pennsylvania. The company was in business from 1905 until 1913.

== History ==
The Dugan glass company was founded by Thomas Dugan, a cousin of Harry Northwood. About 1904 Dugan along with his partner W. G. Minnemayer bought the closed Northwood factory in Indiana, PA and opened it as the Dugan glass company. In 1912 a machine fire destroyed many of the molds being used. The company continued production after the Dugans left the company and was renamed the Diamond glass company in 1913. The company continued production until a fire destroyed the plant on June 27, 1931.

== Production ==
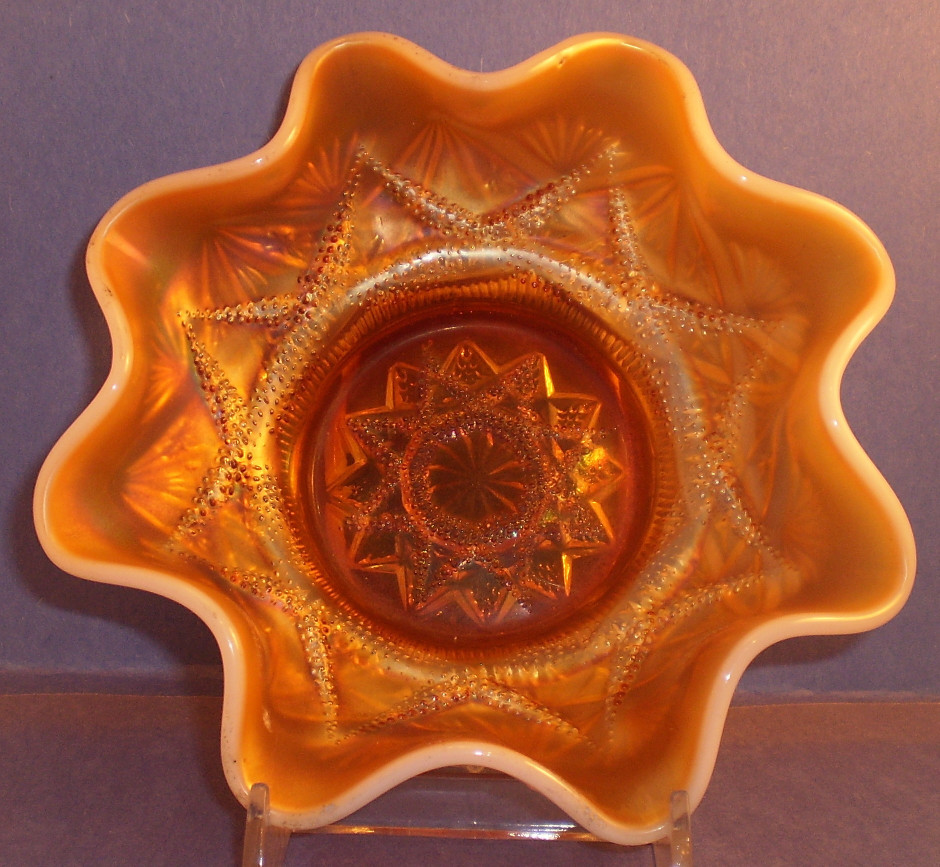
Dugan peach opalescent bowl with marigold carnival treatment and Ski Star pattern.

Dugan is best known for peach opalescent, a type of Carnival glass. They produced the most peach opalescent of any of the carnival glass manufacturers. They also produced deep shades of amethyst glass, some so dark they appeared black. They were also known for deep crimped edges. They also produced Iridescent Frit Glass. The Dugan Pompeian, Venetian, and Japanese glass lines were examples of frit glass. These pieces were rolled in glass frit, which is ground up pieces of glass, and then shaped by hand. After the company was renamed to the Diamond glass company many Dugan molds were still used. To help with identification the title Dugan-Diamond is often used as an umbrella term.

== Patterns ==
Patterns include:

Name	Years Produced	Description
Adam's Rib #900	1925-1931	This pattern consists of thin vertical ribs that mean at a pedestal near the bottom. At the top is horizontal band.
Beaded Shell		A Seashell pattern. Along each of the grooves is a line of dots or beads.
Cherries	1909-1913	A pattern of four groups of cherries with leaves. The cherries are all pointing to the center. Two of the clusters have two cherries and the other two clusters have three cherries. This pattern is an amalgamation of two molds. Two examples are the cherries/jeweled heart and the cherries/daisy and plume.
Coin Spot		Sometimes also called thumbprint this pattern has oval indentations that move from the center outward. Each of the indentations has a stippled texture to it.
Cosmos		An cosmos flower with eight petals sits in the middle with a wreath of leaves surrounding it. This pattern usually has a fluted edge.
Elks		An image of an elk sits in the middle.
Fishnet		This pattern has fishnet like lines around it with a ruffled edge.
Four Flowers		This pattern was used on bowls and plates. As the name suggests it shows four flowers with overlapping crescents separating them.The pattern on the back of the bowl or plate is usually Soda Gold. There is usually no trademark on the underside of this pattern.
Long Thumbprint		This pattern consists eight of long ovals vertically placed on panels around the outside.
Seagull		A seagulls wings and head sit protruding from one side and the tail on the other.
Smooth Rays	-1913	This pattern consists of an even circular base in the center with ribbing that creates a visual ray like effect. The edges are normally ruffled and crimped to varying degrees.
Strawberry		This design is combination of a lily and bowl. The lily's upper-half of this pattern is a quilted diamond, with the lower half being panels with columns of knobs. The bowl contains a strawberry pattern.
Petal and Fan		This pattern used on bowls and plates of various sizes. The items are usually ruffled and it is scarce in marigold.
Six Petals		In the middle this pattern has a single flower with six petals. Surrounding the flower in the middle is a wreath or vine with leaves and flowers.
Ski Star		A small eight-point star in the center of a bigger eight-point star. The lines making up the star have a dotted or stippled texture.
Vintage		This pattern consists of a wreath of grapes and leaves around a flower in the center. The base is the shape of a dome. Unlike the Fenton Vintage design, this pattern is closer to the center and has breaks.
Wreath of Roses		Roses and leavers that go around the outside of the bowl. Only a small rosebowl and a candy dish were produced in this pattern. Occasionally through necking the rosebowls were turned into spittoons.
