= Amberina =

Type of two-toned glassware

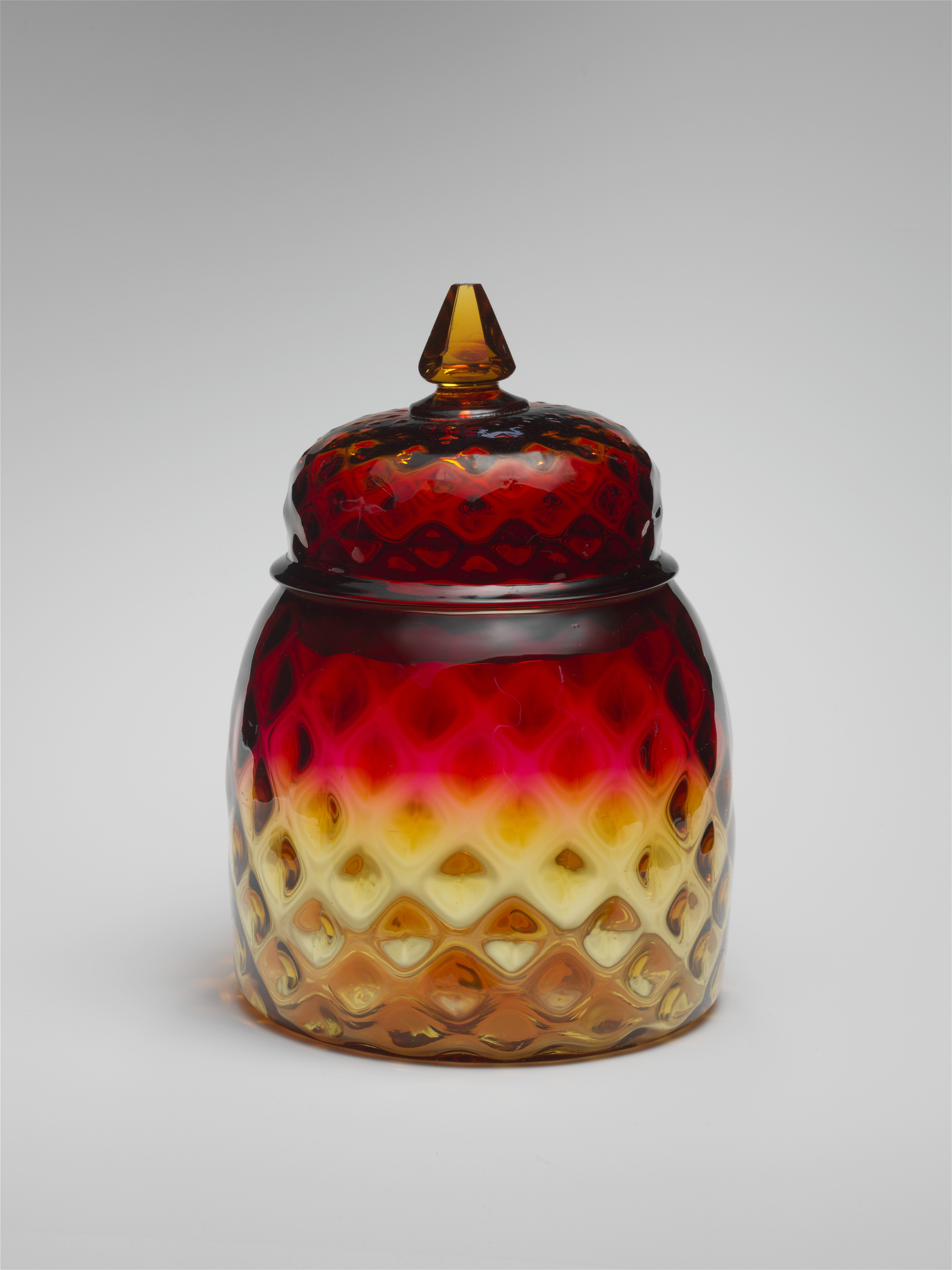
Covered jar, blown Amberina glass, New England Glass Company, 1883-1888

Amberina is a type of two-toned glassware, which was originally made from 1883 to about 1900. Amberina was patented by Joseph Locke of the New England Glass Company, and was produced extensively there. It was also produced a lot by the successor company the Libbey Glass Company at Toledo, Ohio, into the 1890s. It is still being made today. The glass varies in colour from red to amber. Glass which is shaded in colours from blue to amber is known as Blue Amberina or Bluerina.

Amberina is made of an amber glass containing some gold. Its distinct colouring develops with applied reheating and cooling.
