= Libbey-Owens-Ford =

American glass manufacturer

- Industry: manufacture of glass and glass products

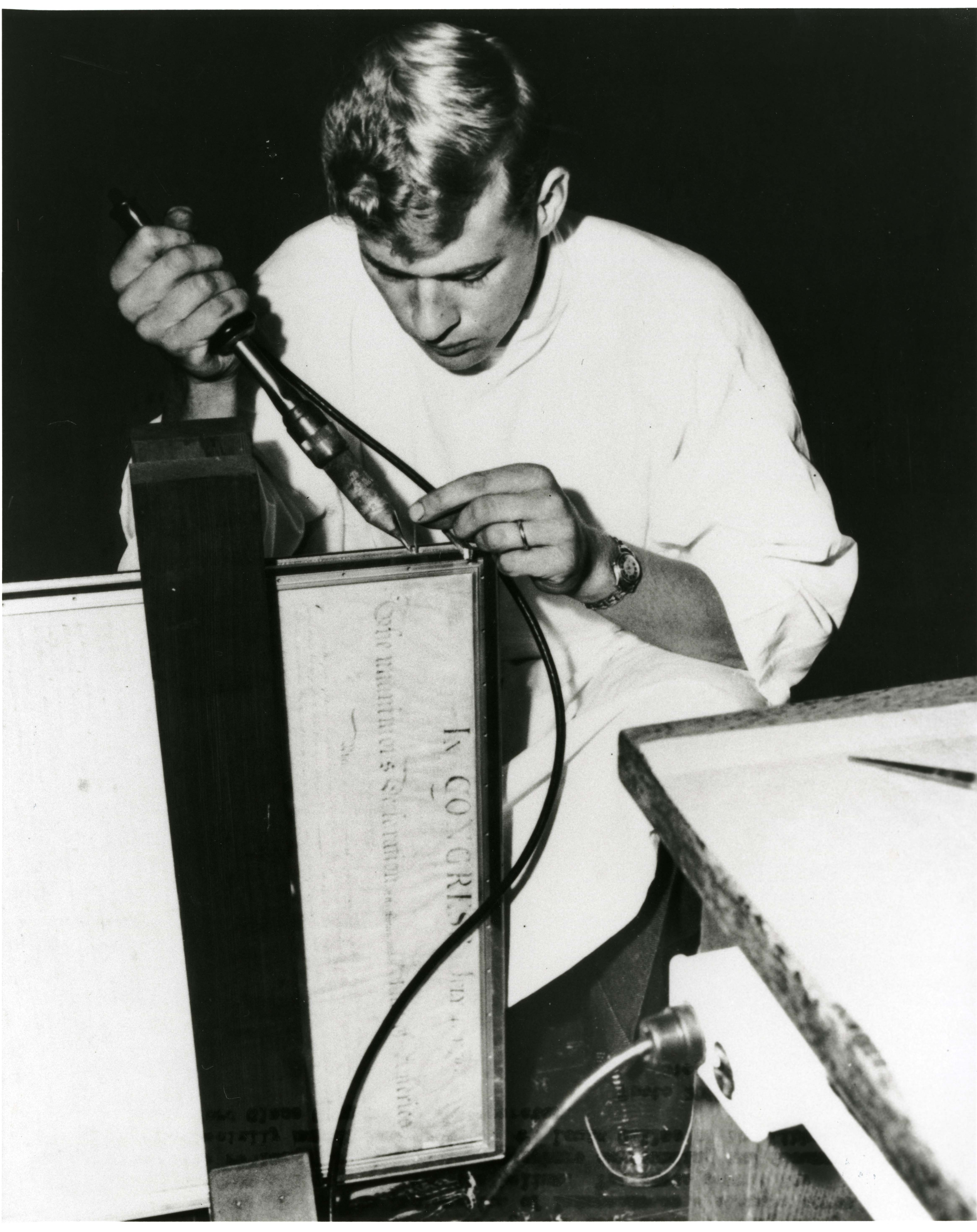
Louis Gilles of Libbey-Owens-Ford helping to create the United States Declaration of Independence enclosure

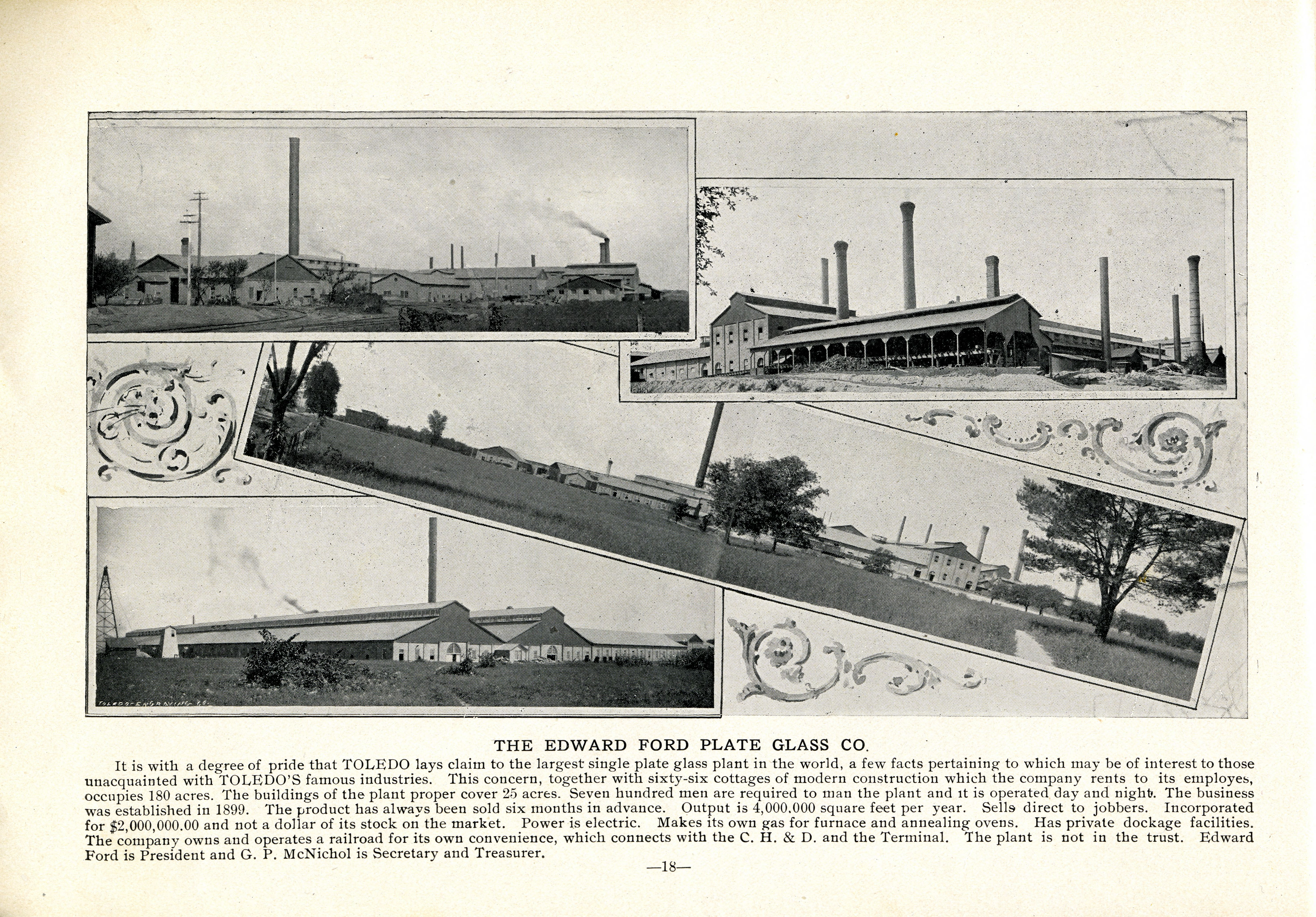
Advertisement for the Edward Ford Plate Glass Company in a 1905 Toledo Chamber of Commerce book

Libbey-Owens-Ford Company (LOF) was a producer of flat glass for the automotive and building products industries both for original equipment manufacturers and for replacement use. The company's headquarters and main factories were located in Toledo, Ohio, with large float glass plants in Rossford, Ohio, Laurinburg, North Carolina, Ottawa, Illinois, Shreveport, Louisiana, and Lathrop, California. The company was formed in 1930 by the merger of Libbey-Owens's sheet-glass operation with the Edward Ford Plate Glass Company, both located in Toledo.

The company's heritage dates back to 1818 with the founding of the New England Glass Company of East Cambridge, Massachusetts, which relocated to Toledo, Ohio, and in 1892 changed its name to Libbey Glass Company under the direction of Edward Drummond Libbey. In parallel, Michael Owens and associates completed work in 1902 on the first fully functioning automatic bottle-blowing machine (the successor of which was honored as a Historic Mechanical Engineering Landmark by the American Society of Mechanical Engineers), and in 1903 incorporated the Owens Bottle Machine Company. In 1912, Owens acquired rights to Irving Wightman Colburn's invention for manufacturing plate glass. In 1929, the Owens Bottle Co. acquired the assets of Illinois Glass Co. of Alton, Illinois, and renamed itself the Owens-Illinois Glass Co., making it the largest glass company in the world. Owens-Illinois Glass Company acquired Libbey Glass Company in 1935, but spun it off as a separate company in 1993.

In June 1916, the Libbey-Owens Sheet Glass Company was organized, and in 1917 the first Libbey-Owens plant opened in Charleston, West Virginia. In 1922, a Libbey-Owens sheet glass plant opened in Shreveport, Louisiana, becoming both the city's largest manufacturer and employer. This plant converted operations between 1972 and 1974 to Libbey Glass table-glassware manufacturing. In 1928, Libbey-Owens was the first company to produce automotive laminated safety glass and won a contract to supply the Ford Motor Company with windshields for the Model A. Libbey-Owens merged with the Edward Ford Plate Glass Company in 1930 to form Libbey-Owens-Ford Glass Company.

In April 1986, LOF sold its glass business and name to the Pilkington Group, a multinational glass manufacturer headquartered in the United Kingdom. The remaining three business units of the company, Aeroquip, Vickers, and Sterling, were retained and the holding company was renamed TRINOVA Corporation. The Sterling business was later sold, and in the late 1990s the company adopted its two leading business unit names, and continued as Aeroquip-Vickers, Inc., until being absorbed by Eaton Corporation in 1999. As part of the Pilkington Group, the company retained the LOF name. However, in June 2006, Pilkington was acquired by Nippon Sheet Glass, and the LOF name was abandoned in an effort to rebrand globally under the Pilkington name.

== See more ==
- Libbey-Owens-Ford Glass Co v Ford Motor Co of Canada Ltd
