= Eda glasbruk =

- Location within Sweden
- Coordinates: 59°55′N 12°16′E
- Country: Sweden
- Province: Värmland
- County: Värmland County
- Municipality: Eda Municipality

Area
  - Total: 0.88 km^{2} (0.34 sq mi)

Population (31 December 2010)
  - Total: 233
  - Density: 264/km^{2} (680/sq mi)
- Time zone: UTC+1 (CET)
  - Summer (DST): UTC+2 (CEST)

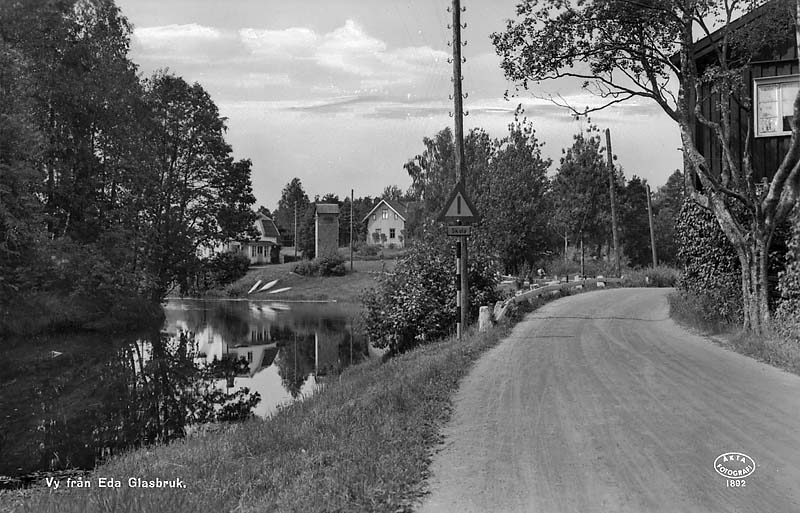
Eda glasbruk

Eda glasbruk is a locality situated in Eda Municipality, Värmland County, Sweden with 233 inhabitants in 2010.

== History ==
In 1835 a glass factory was started at the place that later would be known as Eda glasbruk. The factory was closed in 1953. Eda glasbruk is known for the carnival glass produced there between 1925 and 1929, but also for glass designed by Gerda Strömberg.
