= Edward Libbey =

American businessman (1854–1925)

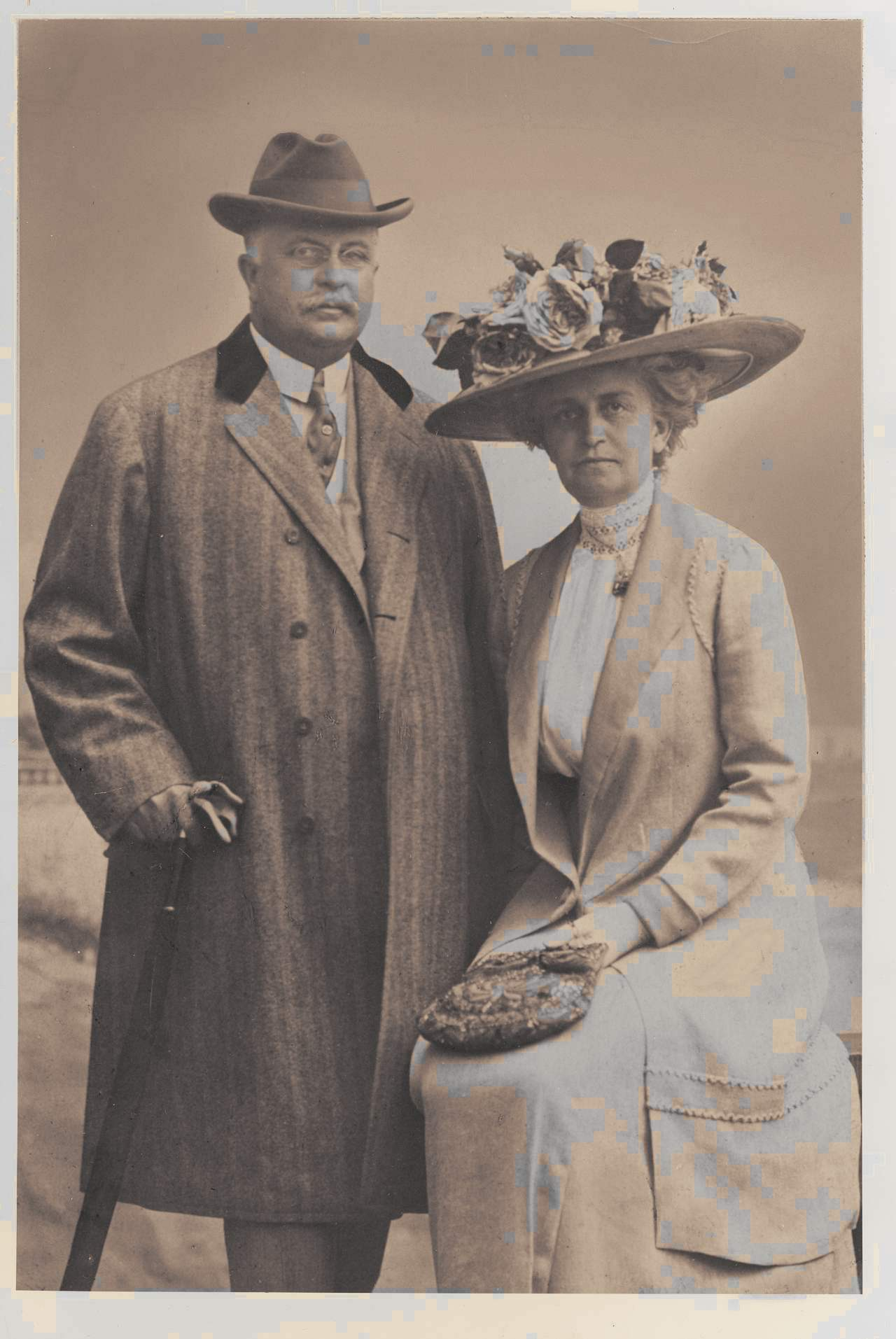
Edward Drummond Libbey (1854–1925) and his wife Florence Scott Libbey (1863–1938), ca. 1901.

Edward Drummond Libbey (April 17, 1854 – November 13, 1925) is regarded as the father of the glass industry in Toledo, Ohio, where he opened the Libbey Glass Company (later Libbey, Inc.) in 1888.

== Biography ==
Libbey was born April 17, 1854, in Chelsea, Massachusetts, USA. After attending Boston University, he worked for the New England Glass Company beginning in 1874, becoming president from 1883 to 1886. In 1888 Edward Libbey moved the New England Glass Company from Cambridge, Massachusetts, to Toledo, Ohio. In 1892 the company changed its name to Libbey Glass Company.

Libbey's success depended heavily on the inventions of Michael Joseph Owens. In 1903, Libbey founded the Owens Bottle Machine Company (later Owens-Illinois), and in 1916, the Libbey-Owens Sheet Glass Company, serving as president of both firms. Libby Glass had five glass manufacturing facilities in the United States, including one in City of Industry, California. In 2004–2005, Libbey announced that they were closing the California store and were going to begin production in China, beginning in 2007.

He was the founder of the Toledo Museum of Art in 1901, serving as its president from 1901 to 1925, funding building construction, and bequeathing to the museum his collection of Dutch and English art. Libbey High School in Toledo, Ohio, was named after him.

=== Ojai, California ===
Edward Libbey's coming to the Ojai Valley in Southern California was the main turning point in the development of the city of Ojai, located in Ventura County, California. He saw the Ojai Valley and 'fell in love,' thinking up many plans for expansion and beautification of the existing rustic town.

A fire destroyed much of the original western-style downtown Nordhoff/Ojai in 1917. Afterwards Libbey helped design, finance, and build a new downtown more in line with the newly popular Spanish Colonial Revival style of architecture. The projects included a Spanish-style arcade along the main street, a bell-tower reminiscent of the famous campanile of the Basilica Menor de San Francisco de Asis in Havana, and a pergola opposite the arcade.

To thank Libbey for his gifts to the town, the citizens proposed a celebration to take place on March 2 of each year. Libbey declined their offer to call it "Libbey Day", and instead suggested "Ojai Day". The celebration still takes place each year in October.

The arcade and bell tower still stand, and have come to serve as symbols of the city and the surrounding valley. Libbey's pergola was destroyed in 1971, after being damaged in an explosion. It was rebuilt in the early 2000s to complete the architectural continuity of the downtown area.

== Legacy ==
Edward Drummond Libbey High School, on Edward Drummond Libbey Way, was named for Edward Drummond Libbey.

== See also ==
- Georgia Cayvan – wore his first glass dress made in 1893
- Houses at Auvers
- Libbey Owens Ford
- Ojai, California – early civic leader

== Notes ==
=== References ===
- Skrabec, Quentin R. (2011). Edward Drummond Libbey, American Glassmaker. Jefferson, North Carolina: McFarland. ISBN 978-0-78648-548-2. OCLC 753968484.
