= Emmons =

Emmons can refer to:

== People ==
- Buddy Emmons (1937–2015), American musician
- Bobby Emmons (1943–2015), American musician
- Carlos Antoine Emmons (born 1973), American football player
- Carlos Emmons (politician) (1799–1875), New York physician and politician
- Delos Carleton Emmons (1889–1965), United States general
- Ebenezer Emmons (1799–1863), American geologist
- Frederick Earl Emmons (1907–1999), American architect
- George F. Emmons (1811–1884), American admiral
- George T. Emmons (1852–1945), American ethnographic photographer
- Harriet Cole Emmons (1873–1956), American clubwoman
- Howard Wilson Emmons (1912–1998), American educator
- Kateřina Emmons (born 1983), Czech sport shooter
- Lyman W. Emmons (1885–1955), American businessman and politician
- Marie Emmons (1872–1945), American politician
- Matthew Emmons (born 1981), American sport shooter
- Nathanael Emmons (1745–1840), American theologian
- Phillip Emmons, pen name of Bentley Little (born 1960), American author of horror novels
- Robert Emmons (1872–1928), American football coach at Harvard and yachtsman
- Samuel Franklin Emmons (1841–1911), American geologist
- Shirlee Emmons (1923–2010), American operatic soprano, writer on music, and voice teacher

== Places ==
In the United States:

- Emmons, Minnesota
- Emmons, West Virginia
- Emmons County, North Dakota
- Emmons Glacier, Washington
- Mount Emmons (Alaska)
- Mount Emmons (Colorado)
- Mount Emmons (New York)
- Mount Emmons (Utah)

== Other uses ==
- USS Emmons (DD-457)

== See also ==
- Ammons, a surname
