= Mount Emmons =

Mount Emmons may refer to:

- Mount Emmons (Alaska), a mountain the Lake and Peninsula Borough, Alaska, United States
- Mount Emmons (Colorado), a mountain in north-central Gunnison County, Colorado, United States
- Mount Emmons (New York), a mountain in southern Franklin County, New York, United States
- Mount Emmons (Utah), a mountain in northern Duchesne County, Utah, United States
- Mount Emmons, Utah, a small unincorporated community in east-central Duchesne County, Utah, United States
