= Derek Hart (American football) =

American football player (born 1992)

Profile
- Position: Long snapper

Personal information
- Born: December 1, 1992 (age 33); Manheim, Pennsylvania, U.S.
- Listed height: 6 ft 4 in (1.93 m)
- Listed weight: 200 lb (91 kg)

Career information
- High school: Manheim Central
- College: James Madison
- NFL draft: 2015: undrafted

Career history
- Green Bay Packers (2017)

Career NFL statistics
- Games played: 2
- Stats at Pro Football Reference

Derek Justin Hart (born December 1, 1992) is an American former professional football player who was a long snapper for the Green Bay Packers of the National Football League (NFL). He played college football for the James Madison Dukes.

== Early life ==
In 2011, his senior year, Hart won the boys' Class AAA high jump for Pennsylvania District Class AAA track and field clearing 6'8". Hart also took second in the high hurdles with a time of 14.94. Played a part in Manheim Central football's 2009 District 3 Triple-A championship.

== College career ==
Played in 43 games at James Madison— serving as the Dukes' primary long snapper for three seasons.

== Professional career ==
Hart signed a reserve/future contract with the Green Bay Packers on March 31, 2017. He was waived on August 28, 2017. He was re-signed by the Packers on November 3, 2017 to replace an injured Taybor Pepper. He was released by the Packers on November 14, 2017 after the team re-signed longtime snapper Brett Goode.
