= Manheim Central High School =

Coordinates: 40.1717°N 76.3921°W

- Manheim Central Barons athletic logo

Location
- 400 Adele Avenue; Manheim, Lancaster County, Pennsylvania 17545; United States

Information
- School district: Manheim Central School District
- Superintendent: Ryan J. Axe
- Principal: Joshua Weitzel
- Teaching staff: 58.01 (FTE)
- Enrollment: 880 (2023–2024)
- Student to teacher ratio: 15.17
- Colors: Maroon and gray
- Mascot: "The Baron"
- Website: Manheim Central High School

Manheim Central High School is a secondary school in the Manheim Central School District. It is located in Manheim, Pennsylvania, United States.

== Athletics ==
=== Football ===
Manheim Central High School has an accomplished football team. In 2003, the Barons had an undefeated season and were the Pennsylvania Interscholastic Athletic Association Triple-A State Champions. Also, in 2009, the team went undefeated all the way up to the state championship game, where they were named the runner-up. The 2009 team had a 15–1 record.

In 2011, the team suffered a detrimental loss to the team; four student-athletes died in a two-car accident on January 16. Nick Bryson, Cody Hollinger, John Griffith, and Devaughn Lee had attempted to get air in a teammate's car. When they landed, they spun sideways into the other lane and were hit broadside, which sent the car flipping into a nearby field. That year for the team became about adversity and the ability to overcome it. With four crucial players gone, the team was young and inexperienced. The first game of the 2011 season was filled with emotion and was dedicated to the boys who died in the accident. The game had four touchdowns, for a total of 28 points. The town speculated that each touchdown represented one of the boys and the total represented another teammate who had died in another car accident, due to a brain aneurysm in 2010. The Barons finished that season 8–3, defying the odds.

In 2018, Manheim Central made it to the championship game of the state playoffs, but was defeated by Penn Hills.

Matt Nagy, former head coach of the National Football League's Chicago Bears, quarterbacked the football team in 1994 and 1995. Under Nagy, the Barons went 26–2 as he recorded 3,500 career passing yards and was named Lancaster County Most Valuable Player in his senior year.

=== Girls' softball ===
In the 2011 season, the Manheim Central girls' softball team were the LL League Section 3 Champions, the District 3 Champions, and the runners-up in the PIAA Triple A States.

=== Field hockey ===
In 1976, Manheim Central's field hockey team, captained by Sue Young, Carol Gibble and Becky Martin beat Springfield to win the state championship. The contest was decided based on penetration time, and many spectators believe it was one of the classic field hockey games of its era.

=== Marching band ===
The Manheim Central Marching Barons, under the direction of John Brackbill, won first place in the Liberty A Division of the 2010 Cavalcade of Bands Championships in Harrisburg.

In 2016 the Marching Barons won first place in the Patriot A Division with a score of 92.25 at Hershey Park Stadium. They also won the special awards for Best Percussion, High Visual, High Music, and High Overall Effect.

== Notable alumni ==
- Mike Shenk (1975), crossword puzzle editor
- Dan Kreider (1995), professional football fullback
- Matt Nagy (1996), professional football coach, 2018 NFL Coach of the Year
- Graham Zug (2006), former college football wide-receiver
- Adam Cole (2007), professional wrestler
- Derek Hart (2010), professional football long-snapper
- Taylor Funk (2017), professional basketball player
- Evan Simon (2020), college football quarterback

== See also ==
- Manheim Central School District
