= Taylor Funk =

American basketball player (born 1997)

No. 33 – Salt Lake City Stars
- Position: Small forward / power forward
- League: NBA G League

Personal information
- Born: November 6, 1997 (age 29) Lancaster, Pennsylvania, U.S.
- Listed height: 6 ft 8 in (2.03 m)
- Listed weight: 230 lb (104 kg)

Career information
- High school: Manheim Central (Manheim, Pennsylvania)
- College: Saint Joseph's (2017–2022); Utah State (2022–2023)
- NBA draft: 2023: undrafted
- Playing career: 2023–present

Career history
- 2023: Maine Celtics
- 2023–2025: Capital City Go-Go
- 2025: NBA G League United
- 2025–2026: San Diego Clippers
- 2026–present: Salt Lake City Stars
- Stats at NBA.com
- Stats at Basketball Reference

Taylor Funk (born November 6, 1997) is an American professional basketball player for the Salt Lake City Stars of the NBA G League. He played college basketball for the Saint Joseph's Hawks and Utah State Aggies.

== High school career ==
Funk attended Manheim Central High School in Manheim, Pennsylvania where he averaged 24.3 points per game as a senior, earning a Class 5A first-team all-state selection and led the league in scoring in back to back years. After graduating, he was the school's all-time leading scorer with 1,977 points.

== College career ==
=== Saint Joseph's ===
Funk began his college career at Saint Joseph's where he appeared in 120 games total where he totaled 670 rebounds, ranking top ten in the Atlantic 10 while shooting 42 percent from the floor, 35.3 percent from three and 81.4 percent from the free throw line. As a senior, he averaged 13.2 points per game, finishing among the top 20 of the Atlantic 10 while scoring in double figures 18 times, which included a career high 29 points against Georgetown.

=== Utah State ===
In 2022, Funk transferred to Utah State, where he appeared in 34 games and averaged 13.4 points, 5.5 rebounds and 1.7 assists per game, while shooting 45.1 percent from the field, 37 percent from the three point line and 90.0 percent on his free throws. He scored in double figures 23 times and had a season high 32 points against New Mexico and by thee end of the season, he was named to the MW all-tournament team and was USBWA All-District VIII.

== Professional career ==
After going undrafted in the 2023 NBA draft, Funk joined the Miami Heat for the 2023 NBA Summer League and was later added to the Boston Celtics' training camp roster after signing an Exhibit 10 contract. Funk ultimately got cut, but later joined the Maine Celtics, the Celtics' G League affiliate.

On December 26, 2023, Funk was traded from the Maine Celtics to the Capital City Go-Go. In July 2024, he joined the Washington Wizards for the 2024 NBA Summer League and on October 13, he signed with the team. However, he was waived six days later. On October 28, he rejoined the Go-Go.

In 2025-26, Funk played for the San Diego Clippers and averaged 11.3 points, 4.4 rebounds, and 2.1 assists per game. On August 24, 2026, he was traded to the Salt Lake City Stars.

== Career statistics ==
=== College ===
Year	Team	GP	GS	MPG	FG%	3P%	FT%	RPG	APG	SPG	BPG	PPG
2017–18	Saint Joseph's	32	21	28.8	.426	.394	.837	4.9	1.3	.8	.5	11.8
2018–19	Saint Joseph's	33	24	27.4	.375	.305	.731	5.5	1.3	.6	.5	8.4
2019–20	Saint Joseph's	7	7	29.9	.400	.250	.333	5.1	2.3	.3	1.0	9.4
2020–21	Saint Joseph's	20	20	32.4	.482	.354	.838	5.7	1.5	.8	.8	17.4
2021–22	Saint Joseph's	28	28	36.1	.406	.373	.870	6.6	1.8	.9	.3	13.2
2022–23	Utah State	34	34	30.6	.451	.370	.900	5.5	1.7	.9	.7	13.4
Career		154	134	30.7	.427	.357	.830	5.6	1.6	.8	.6	12.3

== Personal life ==
Funk is the son of Tim and Kim and has two siblings. He grew up home schooled and majored in communication studies.
