= Sarah Becker =

American linguist (1813–1901)

Sarah Cary Becker (February 14, 1813 – November 27, 1901), also known as Sarah Becker, was an American linguist of Spanish.

== Personal life ==
Sarah Cary Tuckerman was born in 1813 in Chelsea, Massachusetts. Her father was Joseph Tuckerman, a prominent clergyman in Boston. She married Alexander Christian Becker, who was two years her junior, becoming Sarah Cary Becker, and was widowed in her mid-30s in 1849. Their son, George Ferdinand Becker, went on to become an influential geologist.

Becker learned Spanish and spent time living in Berkeley and San Francisco. As a linguist, she is known for her 1887 collection of idioms, Spanish Idioms With Their English Equivalents: Embracing Nearly Ten Thousand Phrases. She was among relatively few female linguists of Spanish in the United States in this period.

She died in 1901, at the Shoreham in Washington, D.C.

== Spanish Idioms With Their English Equivalents ==
Sarah Becker is known for the publication, in 1887, of Spanish Idioms With Their English Equivalents: Embracing Nearly Ten Thousand Phrases, in collaboration with Federico Mora. Another edition of the book exists, but with the copyright listed as 1886. Becker, a native English speaker, worked with Mora, a native Spanish speaker of unknown nationality, to produce the text; both were familiar with the other's language. This enabled them to produce this volume that included around a thousand expressions in Spanish that did not have a literal grammatical translation but could be found as an equivalent phrase in English.

The authors put the Spanish expressions in the left column, and the English equivalents in the right, then grouped the idioms alphabetically in two categories: those with verbs and those without. A few of the idioms would be archaic for the modern reader, because one of the reference works Becker and Mora used for the manual was Don Quixote, as they made clear in the prologue. However, they also included expressions that had become very common in the late 19th century, including those published by the linguists William Ireland Knapp, Hermann M. Monsanto, and Louis A. Languellier.

Spanish Idioms With Their English Equivalents was reprinted by the same publisher, Ginn and Company, in 1899, over a decade after it first appeared, without any modification to the text.
