= Manheim Central School District =

School district in Pennsylvania

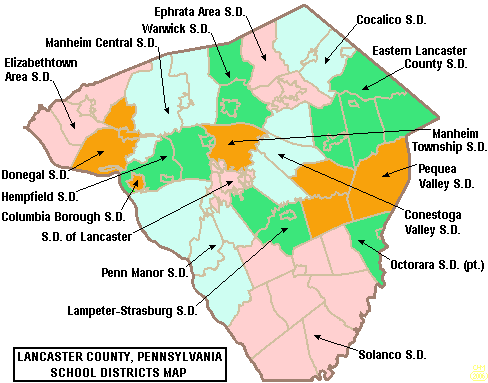

Location
- Lancaster County; Pennsylvania United States

District information
- Grades: K-12
- Superintendent: Dr. Ryan J. Axe

Students and staff
- Students: 2,956
- Athletic conference: AAAAA Lancaster Lebanon League
- District mascot: "The Baron"
- Colors: Maroon & gray

Other information
- Website: manheimcentral.org

The Manheim Central School District is a school district in Lancaster County, Pennsylvania, United States. Manheim Central School District consists of the borough of Manheim, Penn Township, and Rapho Township. Located in northwestern Lancaster County, the school district encompasses 78.2 square miles. The school district lies approximately seven miles north of the City of Lancaster, approximately eighty miles west of the City of Philadelphia and twenty-five miles east of the City of Harrisburg. There are four schools in the district: Manheim Central High School, Manheim Central Middle School, Doe Run Elementary School, and Baron Elementary School.

== Athletics ==
Manheim Central currently has teams for the following sporting events:

- Baseball
- Basketball (boys and girls)
- Bowling
- Cross-country
- Field Hockey
- Football
- Golf
- Rifle
- Soccer (boys and girls)
- Softball
- Swimming
- Tennis (boys and girls)
- Track and field
- Volleyball (boys and girls)
- Wrestling

The conference for each of these teams vary.

=== Football ===
In 2003, the Manheim Central Barons football team won the PIAA AAA State Championship against Pine-Richland. They were undefeated for the entire season. In the following season, Manheim Central was state runners-up. In 2009 they went undefeated until the final game, the state championship game, which they lost 12-7 to the Selinsgrove Seals. In 2018 the Barons were runners-up after making their way once again to the state final.

=== Soccer ===
The Manheim Central soccer team had a successful 2006 season, with a record of 13-1-1. They won their section (as did the junior varsity team), lost in the semifinal of leagues, won the District III championship (defeating Hershey 2 to 1), and finally lost in the AA state championship game to defending champions South Park, 2 to 0. Their coach, Matthew Schwartz, was 2006 AA Boys Soccer Coach of the Year for Pennsylvania.
