= Roland Duer Irving =

American geologist (1847–1888)

- Born: 27 April 1847; New York, New York
- Died: May 30, 1888 (aged 41); Madison, Wisconsin
- Education: Columbia College School of Mines
- Scientific career
- Fields: Geology

Roland Duer Irving (April 27, 1847 – May 30, 1888) was an American geologist. He was born in New York city and graduated from Columbia College School of Mines in 1869 as a mining engineer. In 1879, he received his PhD, also from Columbia.

Soon after his graduation he became assistant on the Ohio geological survey, and in 1870 was elected professor of geology, mining, and metallurgy at the University of Wisconsin. In 1879 the title of his chair was changed to that of geology and mineralogy. He became assistant state geologist of Wisconsin in 1877, and continued as such until 1879. From 1880 to 1882 he was one of the United States census experts, and in 1882 was made geologist in charge of the Lake Superior division of the United States Geological Survey. His specialty was the micro-petrography of the fragmental rocks and crystalline schists, and pre-Cambrian stratigraphy and the genesis of some of the so-called crystalline rocks. He is considered one of the pioneers of petrography in the United States. Irving was eulogized by United States Geological Survey Director John Wesley Powell as part of the 1889 annual report to the Secretary of the Interior.

He was the father of John Duer Irving, another noted geologist and editor of the journal Economic Geology from 1905 to 1918.

== Publications ==
- "Geology of Central Wisconsin" Wisconsin Geological Survey (1877)
- "Geology of the Lake Superior Region" Wisconsin Geological Survey (1880)
- "Crystalline Rocks of the Wisconsin Valley" Wisconsin Geological Survey (1882) Geology of Wisconsin. Survey of 1873–1879, Volume IV. pp. 628–714
- "Mineralogy and Lithology of Wisconsin" Wisconsin Geological Survey (1888)
- "The Copper-Bearing Rocks of Lake Superior" US Geological Survey Monograph No. 5 (1888)
- "On Secondary Enlargements of Mineral Fragments in Certain Rocks" US Geological Survey Bulletin No. 8 (1884)
- "The Archaen Formations of the Northwestern States" US Geological Survey Bulletin No. 86 (1885)
- Observations on the Junction Between the Eastern Sandstone and the Keweenaw Series on Keweenaw ... with Thomas Chrowder Chamberlin. US Geological Survey Bulletin No. 23 (1885)
- "The Classification of the Early Cambrian and Pre-Cambrian Formations" US Geological Survey (1886)
- The Greenstone Schist Areas of the Menominee and Marquette Regions of Michigan: A Contribution ... with George Huntington Williams. US Geological Survey Bulletin No. 62 (1890)
