= Picot =

Looped edging element in lace, crochet, knitting and tatting

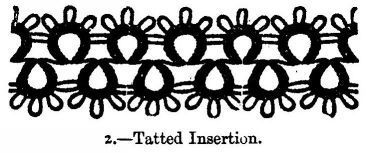
Picots on a tatted insertion. The picots are the small, oval-shaped loops arranged in threes at the top of the tatted material.

A picot /piko/ is a loop of thread created for functional or ornamental purposes along the edge of lace or ribbon, or crocheted, knitted or tatted fabric. The loops vary in size according to their function and artistic intention. The term is a diminutive derived from the French verb piquer, "to prick".

== Method ==
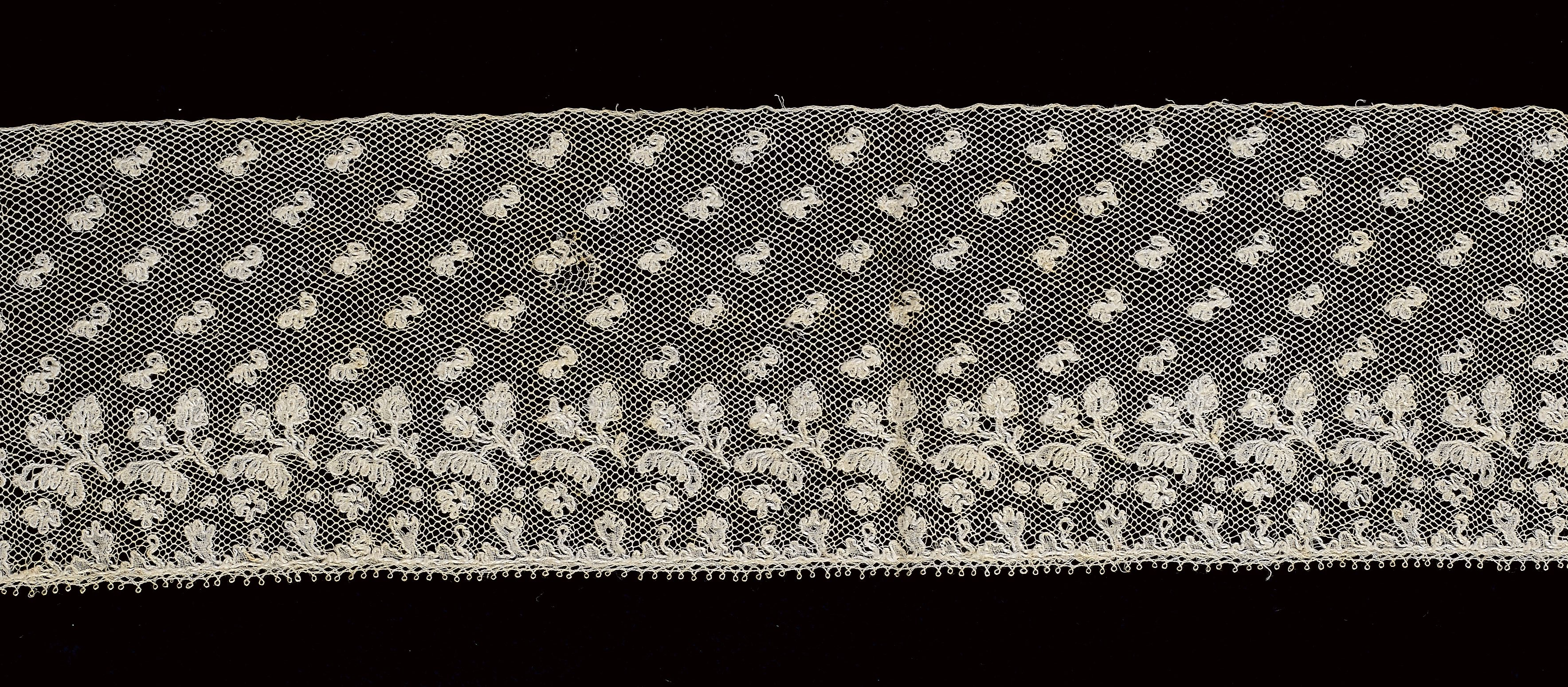
Bobbin lace border with picot edging, Study Collection, ST271, ModeMuseum Provincie Antwerpen

To create a picot in tatting, the first half of a double stitch is made, but instead of pulling the half-stitch taut against the stitch before it, the half-stitch is pinched against the foundation thread and held some distance from the stitch before it. The distance at which the half-stitch is held determines the size of the picot. As the second half of the stitch is formed, it is slid down the foundation thread and into place next to the stitch before it. The resulting picot is thus anchored between two double stitches. It is also possible to anchor the picot between the two halves of a full double stitch.

In crochet, the hook is inserted into the third chain from the hook and pulled through all loops on the chain.

== Uses ==
While picots were once largely ornamental, today they are functional as well. For example, in tatting, the picot is the site of the join between two rings, chains, or other pieces of work. Rather than creating independently tatted rings or chains and then sewing or tying them together, an integral system of picots can be used to join the rings or chains as the work progresses.

In older tatting and crocheting patterns, picots were sometimes specified as purls, purl stitches, or pearl stitches. These specifications are not to be confused with the reverse stitch called 'purl' in knitting.

== See also ==
- Tatting
- Crochet
- Bobbin Lace
- Knitting
