= Marion Harris Neil =

American home economist (1867–1920)

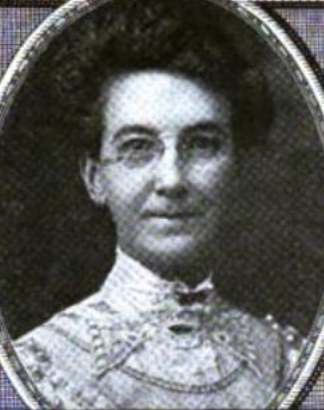
- Marion Harris Neil, from a 1917 publication
- Born: March 13, 1867; Scotland, U.K.
- Died: November 4, 1920 (age 53); Oradell, New Jersey, U.S.
- Other name: May N. Godkin
- Occupations: Writer, editor, cooking teacher, school principal

Marion Harris Neil Godkin (March 13, 1867 – November 4, 1920) was a Scottish writer and editor, based in Philadelphia, Pennsylvania. She was editor of Table Talk magazine, cookery editor at Ladies' Home Journal and The Delineator_{,} and author of several cookbooks.

== Early life and education ==
Neil was born in Calton, Glasgow, the daughter of James Neil and Jane Harris Miller Neil. She studied at the West End Training School of Cookery in Glasgow. She moved to the United States with her widowed mother and younger sister in 1903.

== Career ==
Neil taught cookery in Scotland and was principal of a cooking school in Philadelphia, with her sister Mary Miller Neil as her assistant. In 1905, she was vice-president of the American Household Economics Association. She was editor of Table Talk magazine. Neil, Christine Terhune Herrick and Caroline French Benton were co-editors of the cookery section of The Delineator in 1908, and she was cookery editor of Ladies' Home Journal. In her last year, she ran Greenacres Inn and Tearoom in Oradell, New Jersey.

== Publications ==
=== Books ===
Neil compiled and edited cookbooks, often based on the recipes first published in Ladies' Home Journal or other publications. She also created cookbooks for food companies, to teach consumers how to use specific ingredients, such as baking powder, California peaches, or Crisco.

- How to Cook in Casserole Dishes (1912)
- Candies and bonbons and how to make them (1913)
- Canning, preserving, and pickling (1914)
- A Calendar of Dinners (1914)
- The Story of Crisco (1914)
- The Something-Different Dish (1915)
- Ryzon Baking Book (1916)
- Salads, sandwiches, and chafing dish recipes (1916)
- Favorite Recipes Cook Book (1917)
- Economical Cookery (1918)
- The Thrift Cook Book (1919)
- Sixty-five delicious dishes made with bread (1919)
- Delicious Recipes (1920)

=== Articles ===
Neil wrote regularly for the magazines she edited. She also wrote for The Modern Priscilla, The Inter Ocean, The Plain Dealer, and Canadian Home Journal. Some titles of her articles include the following:

- "A Beginner's Lesson in Cookery" (1908, The Delineator)
- "Valuable Arrowroot Recipes", "Hints for the Lenten Menu", "Some Good Ways of Using Macaroni", "Palatable Ways to Plank Food", "How to Serve Summer Fruits" (1913, Table Talk)
- "Low-Cost Dishes for 'High-Cost' Days", "For Friday, When Every One Has Fish", "What to Do with Sour Milk", "The New Pickles and Chowchows" , "My Soups without Meat" (1914, Ladies' Home Journal)
- "Dainty Cooking for Invalids and Convalescents" (1916, The Modern Priscilla)
- "Hot Weather Drinks", "Wholesome Foods at Reasonable Cost", "The Usefulness of Salt" "When Our Friends Drop In", "The Many Uses of the Lemon", "Try Steaming Your Food" "Sweet and Savory Dishes for the Christmas Table" (1918, Canadian Home Journal)

== Personal life ==
Neil married Irish-born Richard N. Godkin in 1910. She died in 1920, at the age of 53, in Oradell, New Jersey.
