= Modern Priscilla (magazine) =

American women's magazine

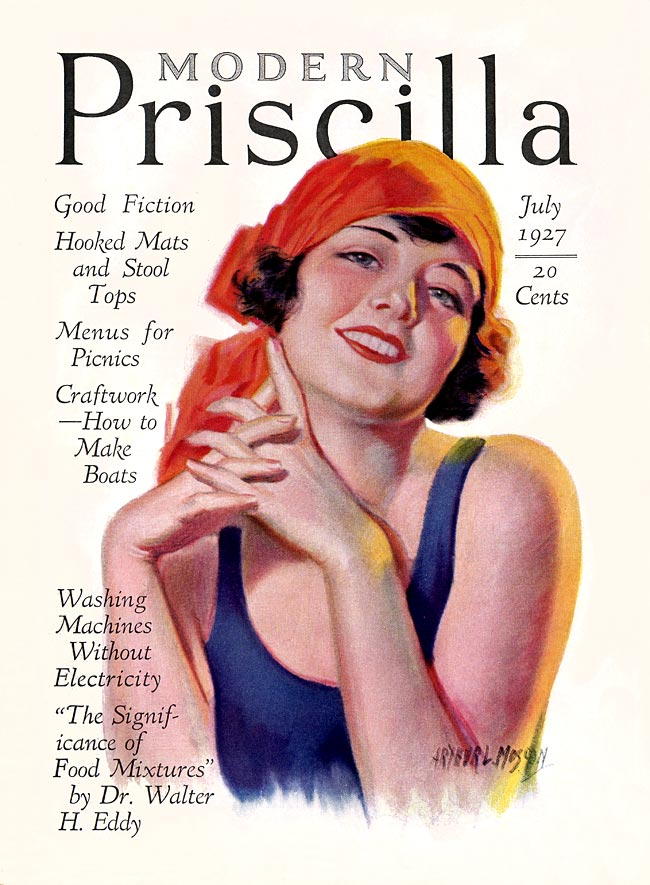
The July 1927 cover of Modern Priscilla

Modern Priscilla (also known as The Modern Priscilla) was an American women's magazine, published in Massachusetts from 1887 to 1930.

== History ==
Modern Priscilla began in Lynn, Massachusetts, as a 16-page magazine focused on fancy-work instructions. (Because the Priscilla mentioned in the New Testament was described as a tent maker, the name "Priscilla" was associated with women sewing and weaving, especially home goods.) Its first editor, Frank Spencer Guild, was an illustrator, and art director of Ladies' Home Journal. Annual subscriptions cost 50 cents in 1888. The magazine's office moved to Boston in 1894.

The magazine was successful for decades. Its slogan in 1907, "A Department Store where 172,710 Women Shop", announced its wide circulation. In 1922, the magazine boasted a circulation of about 600,000. It absorbed several other magazines, including Everyday Housekeeping in 1912 and Home Needlework Magazine in 1917. Modern Priscilla was merged into Needlecraft in 1930.

== Contents ==
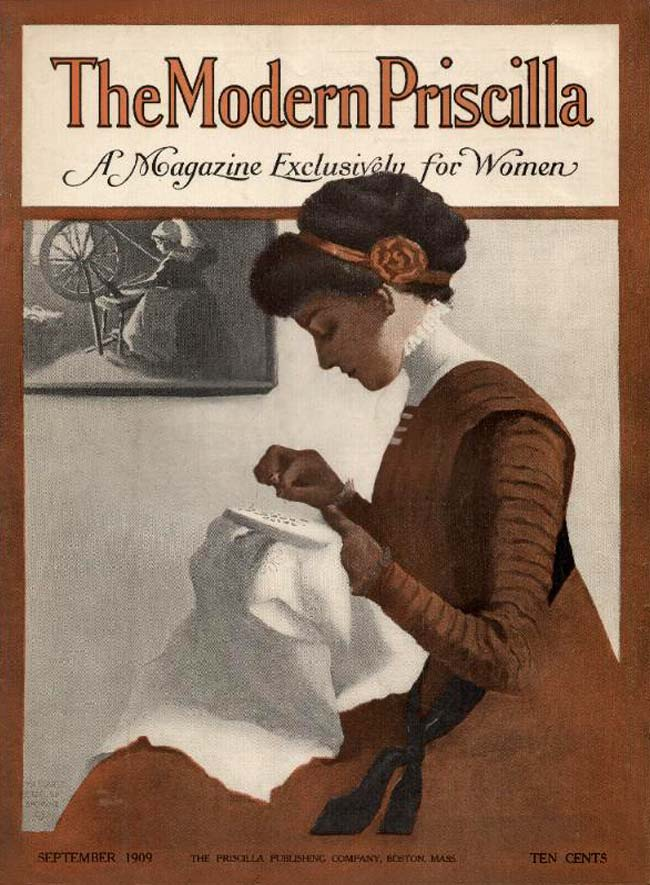
The September 1909 cover of The Modern Priscilla, featuring an illustration by Margaret Fitzhugh Browne

Modern Priscilla featured original short fiction alongside homemaking and fashion advice. It was known for publishing illustrated patterns for sewing, crochet, millinery, basketry, lace making, needlepoint and embroidery. The Priscilla Publishing Company also offered stand-alone books of patterns and recipes.

Notable editors and writers who contributed to Modern Priscilla included Della T. Lutes, Harriet Cole Emmons, Christine Terhune Herrick, Anna Balmer Myers, Mary Card, Mary Harrod Northend, Maud Hart Lovelace, Marion Harris Neil, and Louise Stanley. Cover artists included Sarah Stilwell Weber (May 1919), Clara Miller Burd (August 1922), Charles Archibald MacLellan (November 1925, October 1926) William Haskell Coffin (June 1925, August 1926, March 1928), and Bradshaw Crandell (June 1928, September 1928)

== Legacy ==
The University of Wisconsin–Madison Libraries has twelve issues of Modern Priscilla from the 1920s. Internet Archive has several earlier issues. The New York State Library featured an exhibit of Modern Priscilla covers in December 2011.
