= Joseph Tuckerman =

American clergyman and philanthropist (1778–1840)

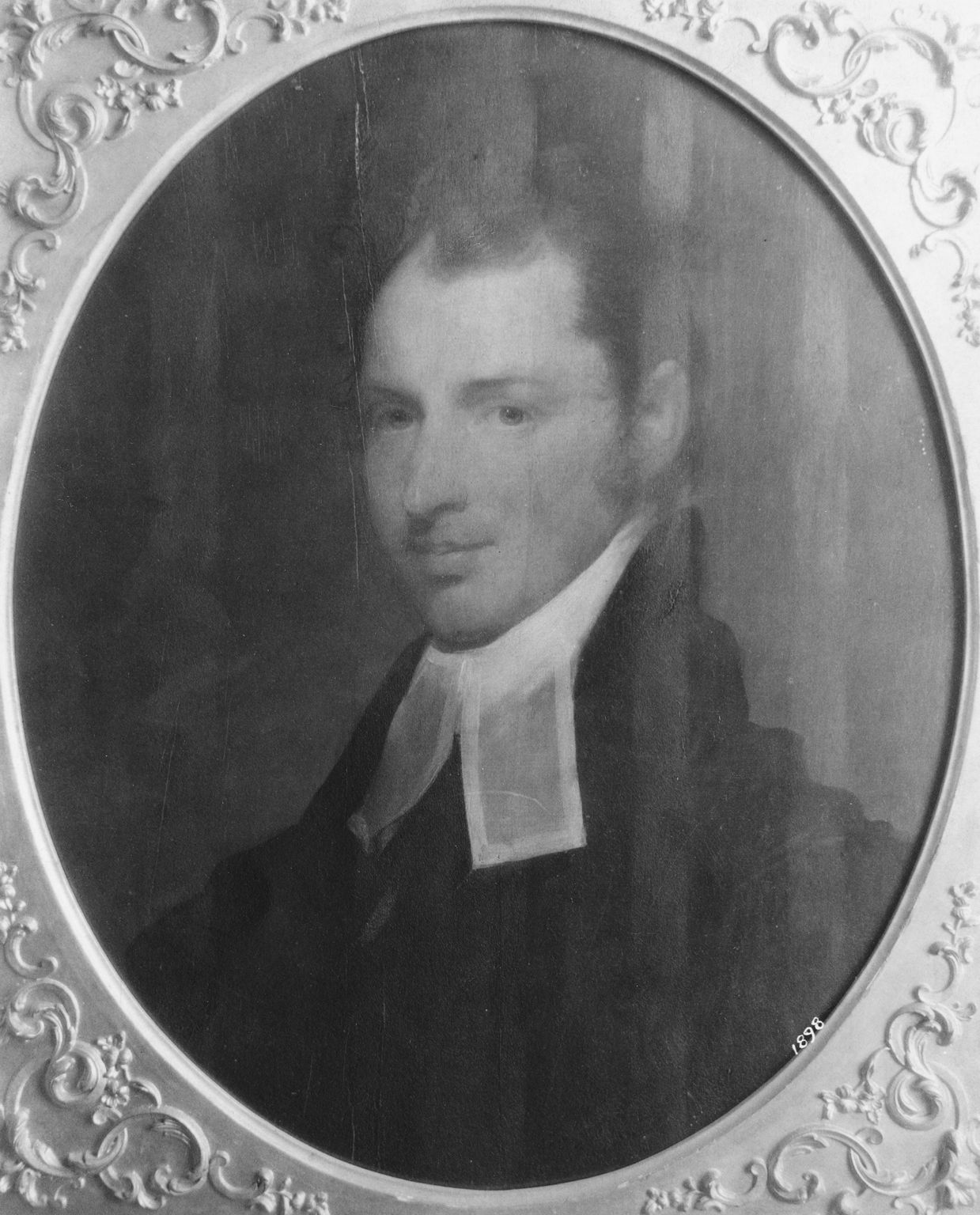
- portrait by Gilbert Stuart
- Born: January 18, 1778; Boston
- Died: April 20, 1840 (aged 62); Havana
- Alma mater: Harvard University
- Spouse(s): Sarah Cary Tuckerman
- Children: 10, including Sarah Becker

Joseph Tuckerman (January 18, 1778 Boston – April 20, 1840 Havana) was a United States clergyman and philanthropist.

== Biography ==
He graduated from Harvard College in 1798, where William Ellery Channing was in his class, and Joseph Story roomed with him. He studied theology, and became a Unitarian pastor in Chelsea in 1801. In 1826 ill health led him to move to Boston. He was appointed by the American Unitarian Association minister at large, devoting himself to city mission work, establishing a ministry-at-large, now known as the Unitarian Universalist Urban Ministry, with the dual focus of empowering Boston’s most underprivileged citizens and transforming the spiritual consciousness of its most privileged residents.

He is best known as one of the founders of the Boston Society for the Religious and Moral Improvement of Seamen (1812), said to be the first sailors' aid society in the United States. He was also a pioneer in the scientific direction of philanthropy. “To the system inaugurated by him,” said Edward Everett Hale, “Boston owes it that in every revulsion of business, or in any great calamity, her ordinary institutions of charitable relief have proved sufficient for whatever exigency.” In France his principles were adopted by Baron de Gérando. In England they resulted in the Tuckerman Institute of Liverpool, and other associations. He visited England in 1833 and formed friendships with Lady Byron, Joanna Baillie, and others, with whom he maintained a constant correspondence.

Tuckerman Street and Tuckerman Hall in Worcester, Massachusetts are named after him.

== Literary works ==
He wrote much in behalf of his projects. His writings were collected in the volume On the Elevation of the Poor (Boston, 1874).
