= George Ferdinand Becker =

American geologist (1847–1919)

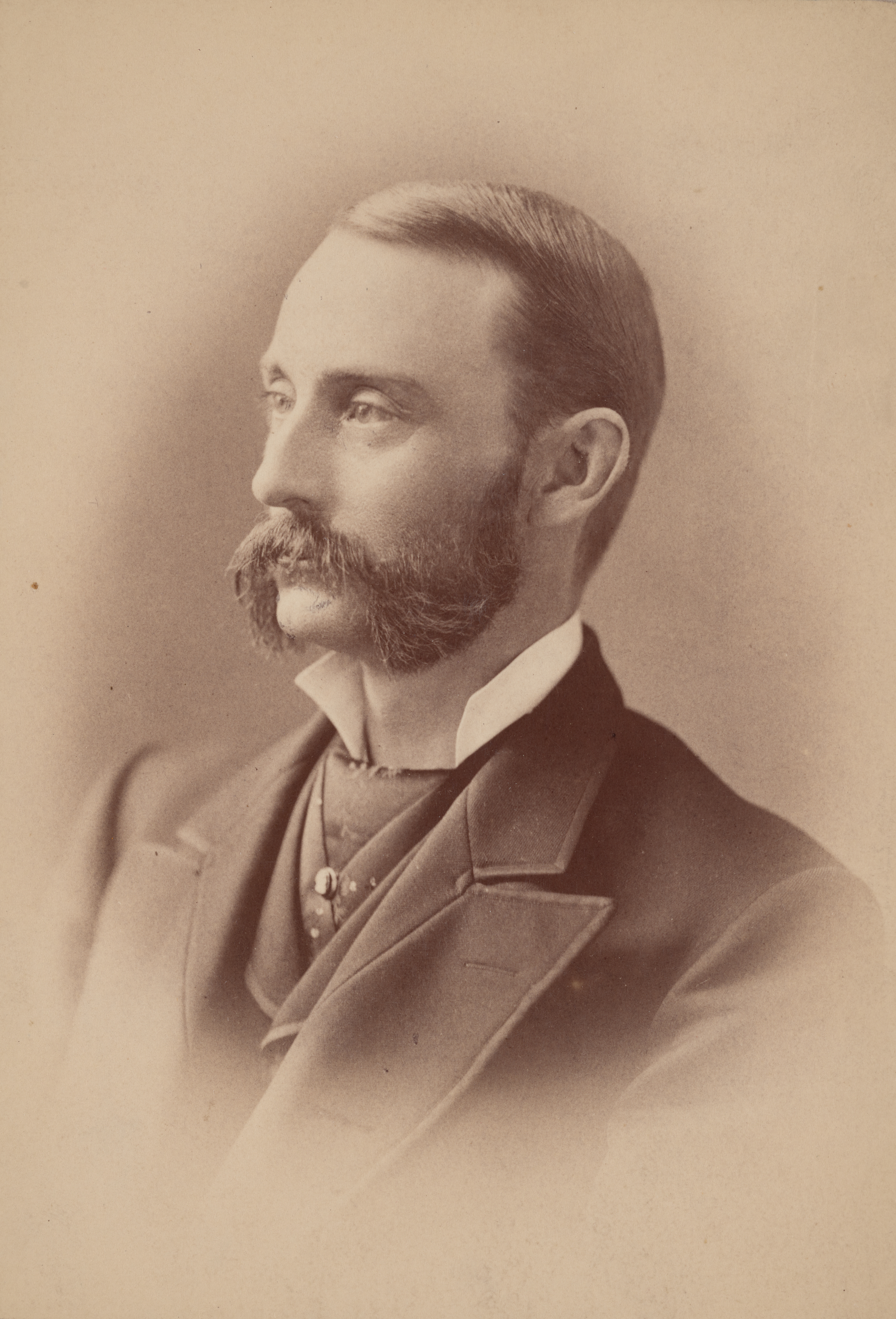
- Born: 5 January 1847; New York City, United States
- Died: 20 April 1919 (aged 72); Washington, D.C., USA
- Education: Harvard University; University of Heidelberg; Royal School of Mines (Berlin)
- Scientific career
- Fields: Geology, Geophysics
- Workplaces: University of California, United States Geological Survey

Signature
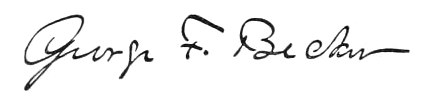

George Ferdinand Becker (1847–1919) was an American geologist. His most important work was in connection with the origin and mode of occurrence of ore deposits, especially those of the western United States.

== Biography ==
Becker was born in New York City, 5 January 1847. He was the son of Alexander Christian Becker and Sarah Cary Tuckerman Becker of Boston, Massachusetts. He graduated from Harvard University in 1868, studied at Heidelberg, receiving the degree of Ph.D. in 1869, and, two years later, passed the final examination of the Royal School of Mines in Berlin. From 1875 until 1879 he was instructor of mining and metallurgy at the University of California, Berkeley, and in 1879 he became connected with the United States Geological Survey, and later was placed in charge of the California division of geology. In 1880 he was appointed special agent of the 10th census, and in 1882 was further appointed special agent in charge of the investigation of the precious-metal industries.

Becker was a leader in mining geology and geophysics, and for many years was the chief of the Division of Chemical and Physical Research in the United States Geological Survey. The investigations under his direction led to the establishment of the Geophysical Laboratory of the Carnegie Institution of Washington.

Becker was elected to the United States National Academy of Sciences in 1901 and the American Philosophical Society in 1907.

In 1896 Becker examined the gold mines of South Africa and at the time of the Spanish–American War was detailed to serve as geologist on the staff of General Bell with the army in the Philippine Islands. Becker served as president of the Geological Society of America in 1914. He died on 20 April 1919 in Washington, D.C.

== Selected publications ==
- 1880: Atomic Weight Determinations:A Digest of the Investigations published since 1814 at Google Books
- 1882: Geology of the Comstock Lode and the Washoe District, with Atlas George Ferdinand Becker at Google Books
- 1885: Geological sketches of the precious metal deposits of the western United States with Samuel Franklin Emmons. Extracted from the Tenth United States Census
- 1885: Geometrical Form of Volcanic Cones
- 1885: Notes on the Stratigraphy of California at Google Books
- 1885: Statistics and Technology of the Precious Metals with S. F. Emmons
- 1886: Cretaceous Metamorphic Rocks of California
- 1886: Geology of the Quicksilver Deposits of the Pacific Slope
- 1886: A New Law of Thermo-Chemistry
- 1886: A Theory of Maximum Dissipativity
- 1898: Reconnaissance of the Gold Fields of Southern Alaska: With Some Notes on General Geology
- 1909: "Relations Between Local Magnetic Disturbances and the Genesis of Petroleum" US Geological Survey Bulletin No. 401
- 1910: "The Age of the Earth" Smithsonian Miscellaneous Collections, Vol. 36, No. 6, Publication 1936
- 1910: President McKinley's Death: A Memorial Address George Ferdinand Becker at Google Books
- 1916: Mechanics of the Panama Canal slides
