= John Duer Irving =

American geologist (1874–1918)

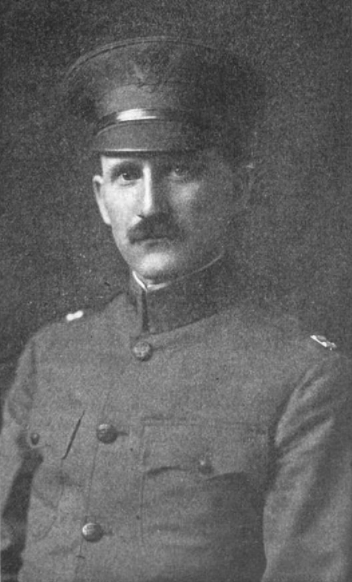
- Born: August 18, 1874; Madison, Wisconsin
- Died: July 20, 1918 (aged 43); France
- Education: Columbia University
- Scientific career
- Fields: Geology
- Workplaces: Yale University, United States Geological Survey

John Duer Irving (August 18, 1874 – July 20, 1918) was an American geologist. He was born in Madison, Wisconsin. He graduated from Columbia University in 1896 and 1899. He was a member of the 11th Engineers, U.S. Army during World War I and died in France on July 20 or 26, 1918, of pneumonia.

In 1899, he joined the United States Geological Survey and was assigned to a party in the Black Hills. He worked closely with Samuel Franklin Emmons on several important publications. He left direct employment with the USGS for one year in 1903 to teach at the University of Wyoming at Laramie. In 1907, he took the chair of economic geology at the Sheffield Scientific School at Yale University. At the time of this death, he was on leave from his position at Yale University.

He was considered one of the foremost representatives of applied geology in the United States. He was also the managing editor of the journal Economic Geology from 1905 until his death.

His father, Roland Duer Irving, was also a noted geologist.

== Publications ==
- "The Downtown district of Leadville, Colorado." with S.F. Emmons. US Geological Survey Bulletin No. 320 (1907)
- "Geology and ore deposits near Lake City, Colorado" with Howland Bancroft. US Geological Survey Bulletin No. 478 (1911)
- "Replacement Ore Bodies and the Criteria for their Recognition" Canadian Mining Institute (1911)
- "Economic resources of the northern Black Hills" with Samuel Franklin Emmons. US Geological Survey Professional Paper No. 26 (1904)
