= Anna Balmer Myers =

American writer and teacher (1884–1972

- Born: October 11, 1884; Manheim, Pennsylvania, U.S.
- Died: April 7, 1972 (aged 87); Philadelphia, Pennsylvania, U.S.
- Resting place: Fairview Cemetery, Manheim, Pennsylvania, U.S.
- Education: Drexel University
- Occupations: Writer, teacher
- Writing career
- Period: 1920–1968 (as a writer)

Anna Balmer Myers was an American author of novels and poetry featuring the local color of Lancaster County, Pennsylvania. In addition to her writing career Myers spent more than 35 years teaching at a Philadelphia school for physically disabled students.

== Early life ==
Myers was born October 11, 1884, in Manheim, Lancaster County, Pennsylvania, the daughter of John B. and Lizzie Balmer Myers. After graduating from Manheim public schools she attended Drexel University. She taught at the Widener School for Crippled Children (now Widener Memorial School) in Philadelphia.

== Writing life ==
Myers wrote about the Plain people of Lancaster County. Her first three novels were Patchwork: a Story of the Plain People (1920), Amanda: a Daughter of the Mennonites (1921), and The Madonna of the Curb (1922). Her published poetry collections were Rain on the Roof (1931) and Late Harvest. In 1968, when Myers was 82 years old, her novel I Lift My Lamp was published. This final novel incorporated Balmer family history into the story of Henry William Stiegel and the founding of his glassworks in Manheim.

== Personal life ==
Myers was an expert on glassmaker Henry William Stiegel, and she gave lectures on Stiegel and his time period. In 1934, she was a member of the General Committee that helped erect a memorial to Stiegel in Manheim, Pennsylvania.

She was a member of both the National Society Daughters of the American Colonists, and the Daughters of the American Revolution.

Myers died in Philadelphia on April 7, 1972. She is buried at Fairview Cemetery, Manheim, Lancaster County, Pennsylvania. Myers was the last member of her immediate family.
