= Emmons Glacier =

Glacier in Washington, United States

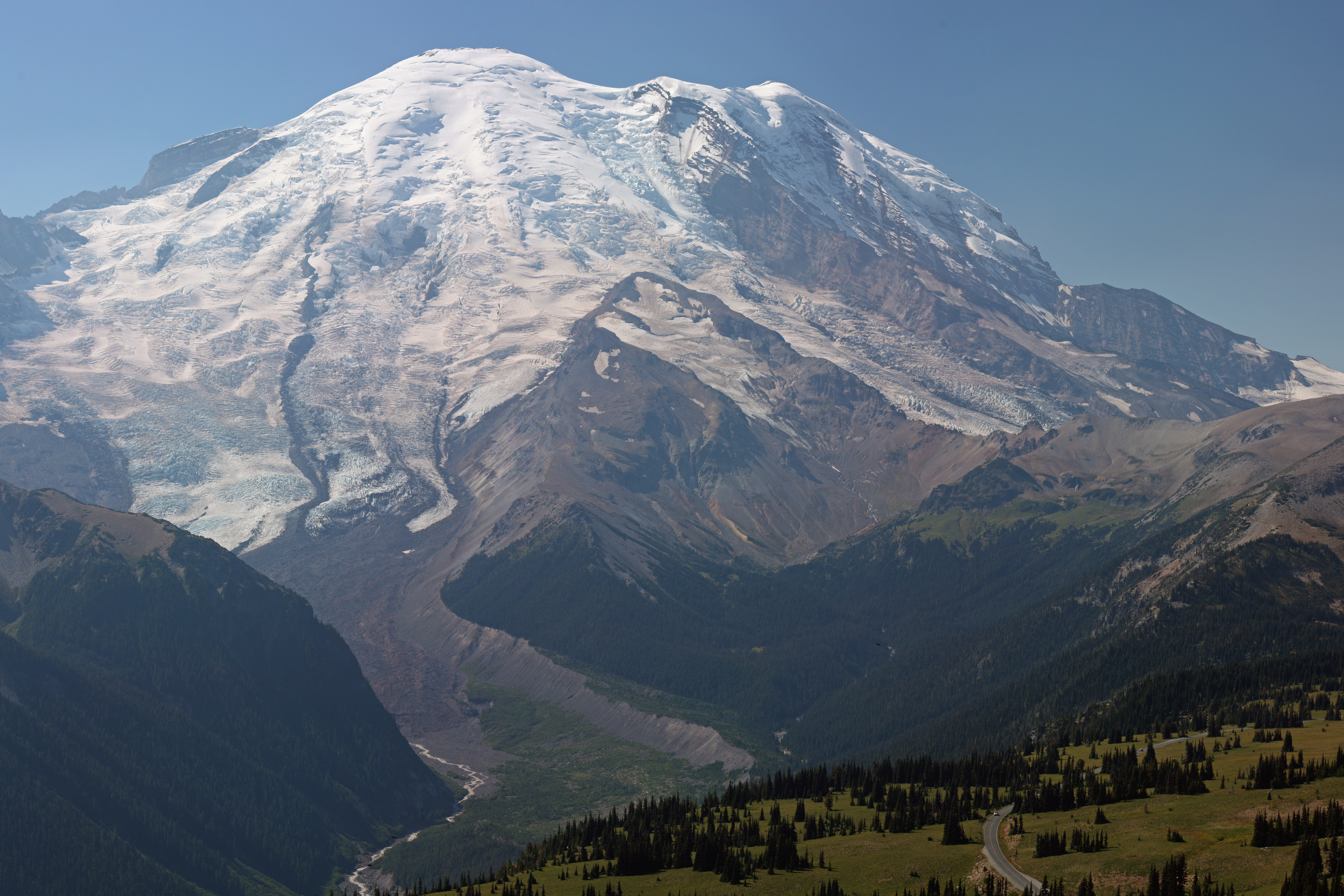
- From just below the summit of Mount Rainier, Emmons Glacier descends to the left of Steamboat Prow (center), which divides it from Winthrop Glacier (right).

- Location within Washington (state)
- Type: Mountain glacier
- Location: Mount Rainier National Park, Pierce County, Washington, USA
- Coordinates: 46°51′44″N 121°43′01″W
- Area: 4.3 sq mi (11 km^{2})
- Length: 3.9 mi (6.3 km) estimated
- Terminus: Moraine
- Status: Retreating

Emmons Glacier is on the northeast flank of Mount Rainier, in Washington. At 4.3 sq mi (11 km^{2}), it has the largest surface area of any glacier in the contiguous United States. The glacier was named after the geologist Samuel Franklin Emmons after his involvement in a survey of Mount Rainier in 1870.

Starting at an elevation of over 13,800 ft (4,200 m), the Emmons glacier flows down eastward. Near the Disappointment Cleaver at 12,200 ft (3,700 m), the Emmons is joined by the Ingraham Glacier flowing to the south. The glaciers flow together and remain connected until they split up upon reaching the wedge of Little Tahoma Peak. As the Emmons flows northeast, the massive glacier descends until it reaches its rocky lower terminus at about 5,100 ft (1,600 m) in elevation.

In the 1930s, the glacier was found to be receding quickly. In 1963, however, a rock fall from Little Tahoma Peak covered the lower glacier with rock debris. The debris cover insulated the ice from melting. As a result of decreased melting, the glacier advanced rapidly in the early 1980s. That advance was continuing by 1992, but at a slower rate; ice beneath the rock debris was melting irregularly and forming a vast hummocky area. By 2003, the glacier was again retreating. "In the past few decades the glaciers [in the American West] have been receding, continuing a trend from the Little Ice Age."

Emmons Glacier is often used as a route (the Columbia Crest route) to climb to the summit of Mount Rainier. There is a Ranger Station at Camp Schurman that was established on the edge of the Steamboat Prow.

In June 2012, ranger Nick Hall, 33, fell approximately 2,500 feet down the Emmons Glacier and died during a rescue attempt in which four climbers fell into a crevasse on the glacier.

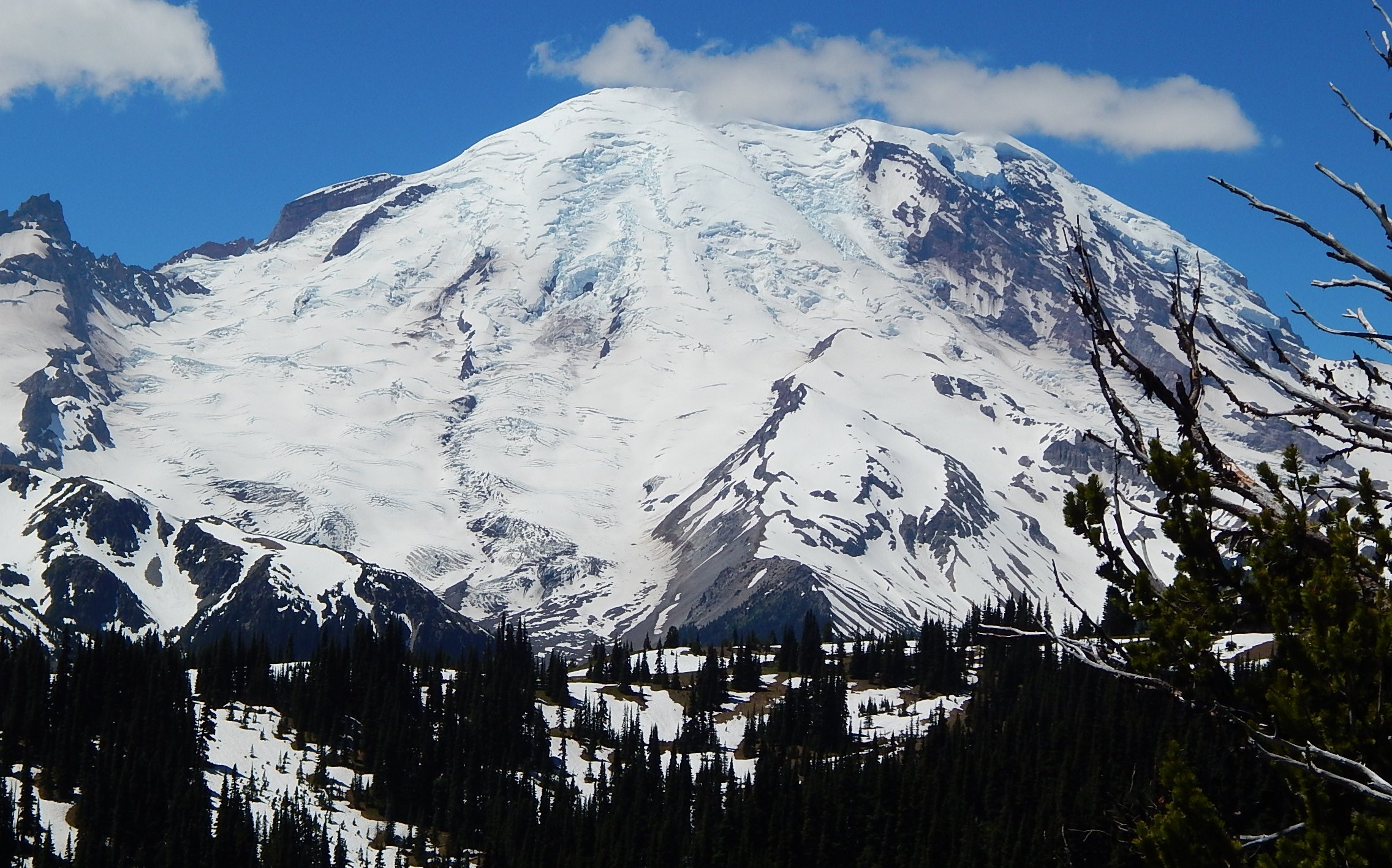
Emmons Glacier on Mount Rainier seen from the road to Sunrise

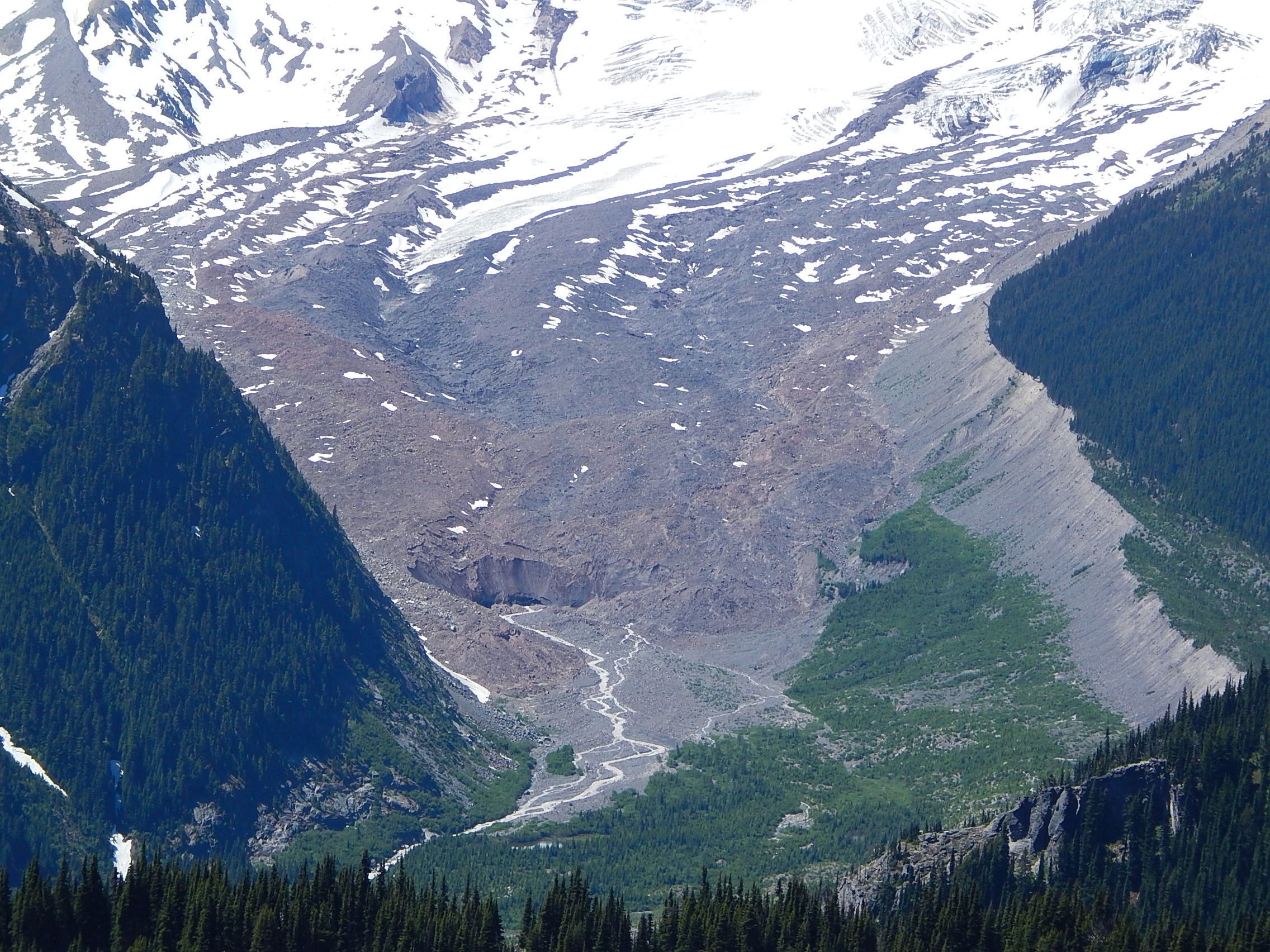
Emmons Glacier terminus

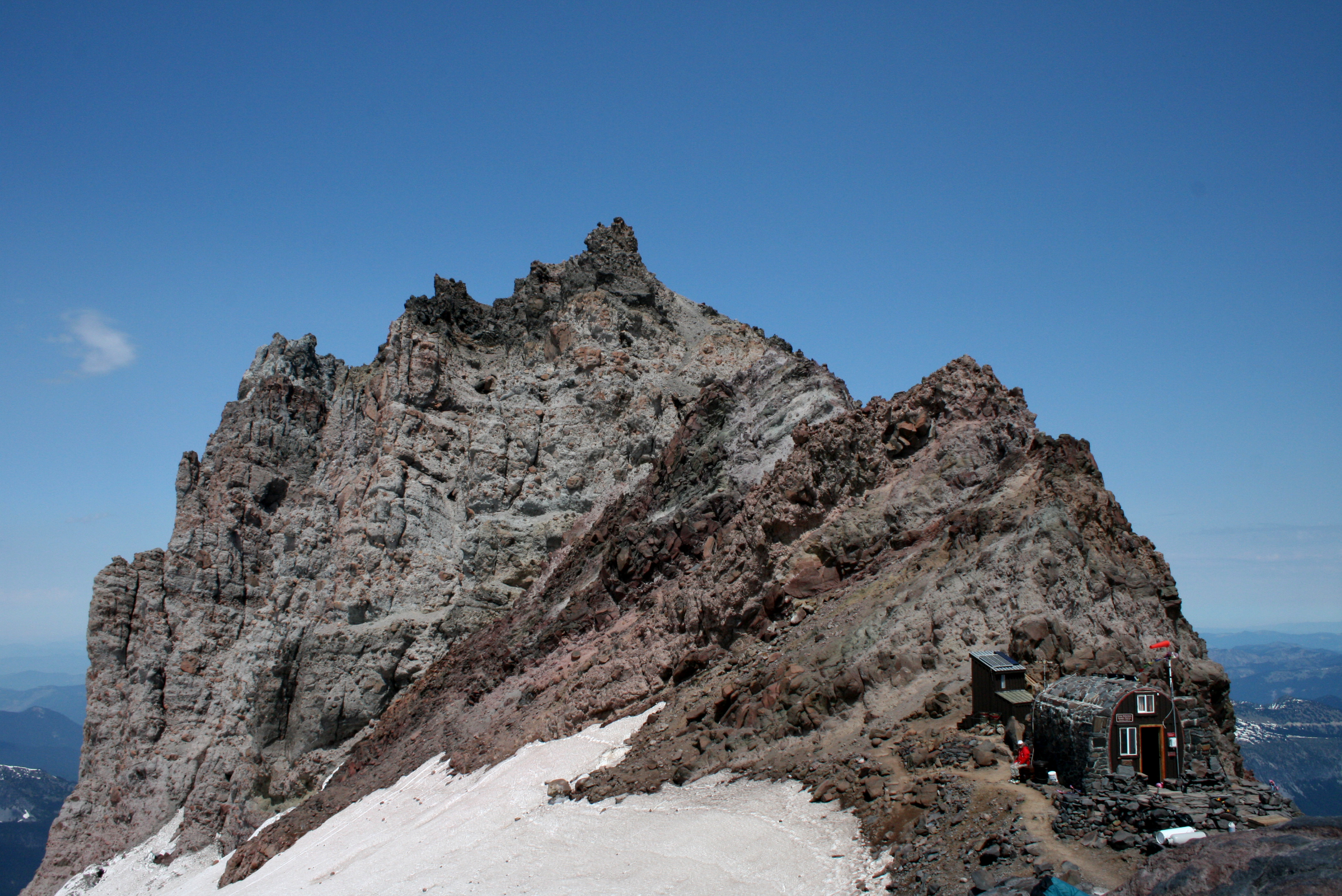
The Ranger Station at Camp Schurman on the Emmons Glacier at Mt. Rainier, WA

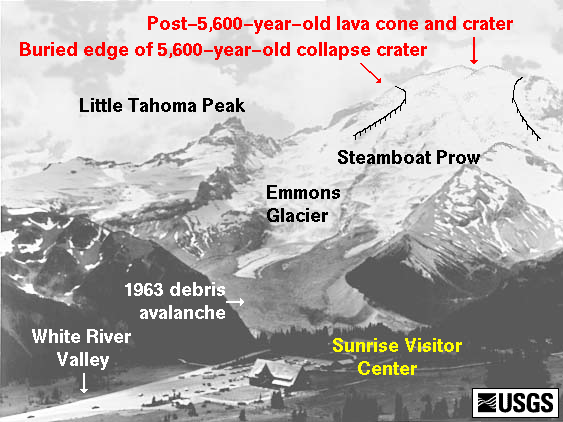
Illustration of area around Emmons Glacier

== See also ==
- List of glaciers in the United States
