= Harriet Cole Emmons =

American home economist

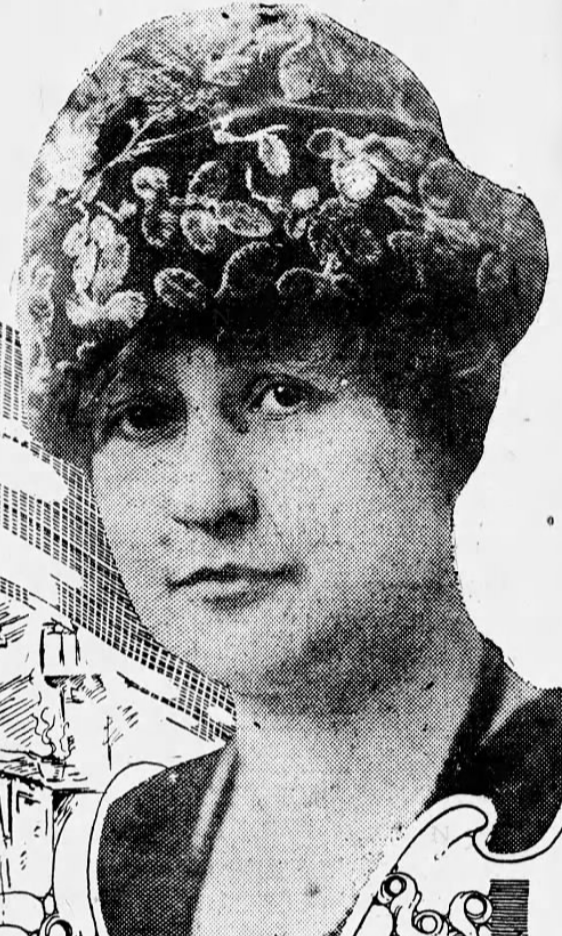
- Harriet Cole Emmons, from a 1919 publication
- Born: Harriet A. Cole; July 1, 1873; Brooklyn, New York, U.S.
- Died: May 13, 1956 (aged 82); Waterbury, Vermont, U.S.
- Other names: Harriett Cole Emmons
- Occupation: Home economist

Harriet A. Cole Emmons (July 1, 1873 – May 13, 1956) was an American home economist, clubwoman, and writer. She tested dyes, developed recipes, and promoted electrical appliances to housewives. She was the first president of the New York League of Business and Professional Women.

== Early life and education ==
Emmons was born in Brooklyn, New York, the daughter of Simeon Lamartine Cole and Lora Estella Dewey Cole. Her father ran a newspaper in the Genesee Valley, before moving to Brooklyn. She earned a diploma from Pratt Institute in 1893.

== Career ==
Emmons worked in advertising and marketing, supervising demonstrators. She worked for the Royal Baking Powder Company and the General Chemical Company of New York, and ran an industrial test kitchen at National Aniline. She contributed to a cookbook, Ryzon Baking Book (1917), focused on uses for baking powder. She was field editor for The Modern Priscilla, a women's magazine.

In 1922, Emmons directed a summer course on home economics demonstration work and promoted electrical appliances at Chautauqua, New York. She worked for the Barnsdall Products Corporation in 1924. In 1928 Emmons opened an "educational publicity" office in Freeport, Long Island. She judged a "culinary and arts competition" at the Hotel Astor in 1929. In 1938 she was hostess-director of Fletcher Farm School in Ludlow, Vermont, and gave a radio lecture on "Unspoiled Vermont".

Emmons was the first president of the New York League of Business and Professional Women, and served on the executive committee of the League for Business Opportunities for Women. In 1947 she was a committee chair with the Vermont Federation of Women's Clubs. She was a member of the Daughters of the American Revolution and the American Home Economics Association.

== Publications ==
- "Has Paying 'Farm' in City" (Forbes, 1917)
- "Anna Tackmeyer — Chef" (Woman's Home Companion, 1919)
- "Doing Housework in Comfort" (1923)
- "Plans for the Home Laundry" (1928)

== Personal life ==
Cole married Newton H. Emmons in 1898. They had a daughter, Elizabeth Bancroft Emmons. Her husband died in 1916. She died in 1956, at the age of 72, in Waterbury, Vermont.
