= Samuel Franklin Emmons =

American geologist

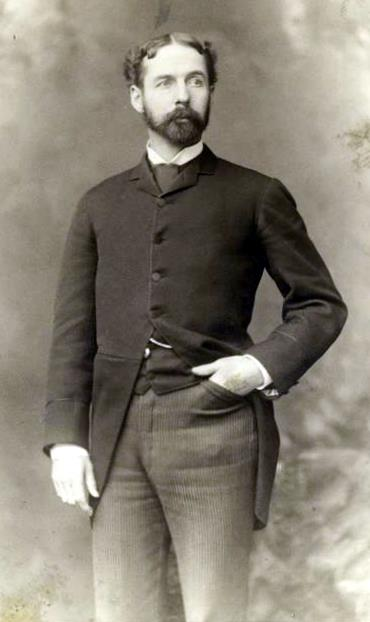
- Education: Harvard University; Ecole des Mines; Freiberg (Saxony) mining school
- Scientific career
- Fields: Geology
- Workplaces: United States Geological Survey

Samuel Franklin Emmons (March 29, 1841 – March 28, 1911) was an American geologist. He was born in Boston, Massachusetts. He graduated from Harvard University in 1861 and studied at the Ecole des Mines in Paris, France, from 1862 to 1864 and at the Freiberg (Saxony) mining school in 1865. In May 1867, he was appointed assistant geologist under Clarence King on the American geological exploration of the fortieth parallel, and in July 1879 became geologist in charge of the Colorado division of the United States Geological Survey. He traveled extensively throughout the United States in connection with his work, and in 1870 made a survey, along with A. D. Wilson, of Mount Rainier, the highest and most inaccessible peak in the Cascade Range. The largest glacier in the contiguous United States, Emmons Glacier, is located along their survey route and is named after Emmons.

During the autumn of 1872, with Clarence King, Emmons discovered the locality of the supposed diamond fields in Colorado, and was active in exposing their fraudulent character.

Emmons is the namesake of Mount Emmons, Colorado, and Mount Emmons, Utah.

Emmons was president of the Geological Society of America in 1903.

Emmons was the founder and first president of the Colorado Scientific Society in 1882.

== Publications ==
- "Descriptive Geology," with Arnold Hague. Published as Vol. 2 of the "Reports of the Exploration of the Fortieth Parallel" by Clarence King (1877)
- "Statistics and Technology of the Precious Metals" with George Ferdinand Becker (1885)
- "Geological sketches of the precious metal deposits of the western United States" (1885) with George Ferdinand Becker. Extracted from the Tenth United States Census
- "Geology and mining industry of Leadville, Colorado, with atlas" with William Francis Hillebrand, Antony Guyard, and Whitman Cross. US Geological Survey No. 12 (1886)
- "Geology of the Denver basin in Colorado" with Whitman Cross and George Homans Eldridge. US Geological Survey Monograph No. 27 (1896)
- "Clarence King: A Memorial" (1902)
- "The Downtown district of Leadville, Colorado" with John Duer Irving US Geological Survey Bulletin No. 320 (1907)
