= William Ireland Knapp =

William Ireland Knapp (New York March 10, 1835 – Paris December 5, 1908), was an American scholar of Spanish studies.

== Biography ==
Knapp received his Bachelor of Arts in 1860, and taught at Colgate University. He was Professor of Ancient and Modern Languages at Vassar College from 1865 to 1867. After which time he travelled through England, France and Spain. In 1877 he was appointed Knight of the Order of Isabella the Catholic. That year he returned to America to teach at Yale University. While at Yale he taught at the renowned Spanish scholar Archer Milton Huntington, founder of the Hispanic Society of America. In 1892 he was appointed Professor of Spanish Language and Literature at the University of Chicago, where he served for three years.

== Works ==
He republished the works of Juan Boscan (1875) and Diego Hurtado de Mendoza (1877). He is the author of:

- Concise bibliography of Spanish grammars and dictionaries: from the earliest period to the definitive edition of the Academy's dictionary, 1490-1780 (Boston, 1884)
- Life, Writings, and Correspondence of George Borrow. Derived from Official and other Authentic Sources, London, 1899, 2 volumes and the reading of George Borrow (making him also expert in Basque studies).
- A grammar of the modern Spanish language as now written and spoken in the capital of Spain (1882?).
