= Marie Emmons =

American politician (1872–1945)

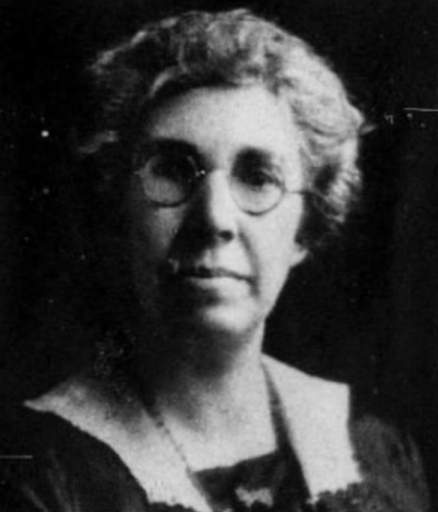
- Emmons in 1923

Member of the Connecticut House of Representatives from Hartland
- In office 1923–1925 Serving with Byron C. Stratton
- Preceded by: Walter E. Cole; David N. Gaines
- Succeeded by: Edward G. Wraight; George L. Goetz

Personal details
- Born: Marie Phelps; October 18, 1872 East Hartland, Connecticut, U.S.
- Died: May 10, 1945 (aged 72) Hartford, Connecticut, U.S.
- Party: Republican
- Spouse: Edward Emmons (m. 1902)
- Children: 4

Marie Emmons (October 18, 1872 – May 10, 1945) was an American politician who served in the Connecticut House of Representatives from 1923 to 1925, representing the town of Hartland as a Republican.

== Personal life ==
Emmons was born Marie Phelps on October 18, 1872, in East Hartland, Connecticut. She worked as a schoolteacher in Hartland and Granby before marrying Edward Emmons in 1902. Together, they had four children. Their son Nathaniel would later serve as a member of the Connecticut House of Representatives and as first selectman of Hartland.

Emmons died on May 10, 1945, at Hartford Hospital in Hartford, Connecticut. She was 72.

== Political career ==
Emmons was elected to the Connecticut House of Representatives in 1922 as one of two representatives from the town of Hartland. She served alongside fellow Republican Byron C. Stratton and did not run for reelection in 1924. Emmons and Stratton were succeeded by Republican Edward G. Wraight and Democrat George L. Goetz.

Emmons was a supporter of Prohibition.
