= Mount Emmons (Utah) =

Summit in Utah, U.S.

- Location within Utah

Highest point
- Elevation: 13,448 ft (4,099 m) NAVD 88
- Prominence: 930 feet (283 m)
- Coordinates: 40°42′42″N 110°18′14″W

Naming
- Etymology: Samuel Franklin Emmons

Geography
- Location: Duchesne County, Utah, U.S.
- Topo map: USGS Mount Emmons

Mount Emmons (or Emmons Peak) is a summit in Duchesne County, Utah, United States. It is located within the Ashley National Forest and the High Uintas Wilderness. It is situated about 5.76 miles (9.27 km) southeast of Kings Peak and has an elevation of 13,448 feet (4,099 m).

It was named for geologist Samuel Franklin Emmons (as was another peak in Colorado).

Mount Emmons is also the name of a very small community 1 mile (1.6 km) southeast of the town of Altamont, Utah. and about 25 miles (40 km) south of Emmons Peak.

== See also ==
- List of mountains in Utah
- Mount Emmons (Colorado)
