= Mount Emmons (Colorado) =

Mountain in the American state of Colorado

- Location within Colorado

Highest point
- Elevation: 12,401 ft (3,780 m)
- Prominence: 592 ft (180 m)
- Isolation: 4.18 mi (6.73 km)
- Coordinates: 38°53′11″N 107°03′04″W

Naming
- Etymology: Samuel Franklin Emmons

Geography
- Location: Gunnison County, Colorado; United States
- Parent range: Elk Mountains
- Topo map(s): USGS 7.5' topographic map Oh-be-joyful

Mount Emmons is a mountain summit in the Elk Mountains range of the Rocky Mountains in north-central Gunnison County, Colorado, United States.

== Description ==
The 12,401-foot (3,780 m) peak is located within the Gunnison National Forest, 4.2 miles (6.7 km) west-northwest (bearing 288°) of the Town of Crested Butte.

The mountain was named in honor of geologist Samuel Franklin Emmons (as was another peak in Utah).

== Historical names ==
- Mount Emmons
- Red Lady

== See also ==
- List of Colorado mountain ranges
- List of Colorado mountain summits
  - List of Colorado fourteeners
  - List of Colorado 4000 meter prominent summits
  - List of the most prominent summits of Colorado
- List of Colorado county high points
- Mount Emmons (Utah)
