= Manheim, Pennsylvania =

Borough in Pennsylvania, US

Manheim, Pennsylvania Mannem (Pennsylvania German)
- Borough
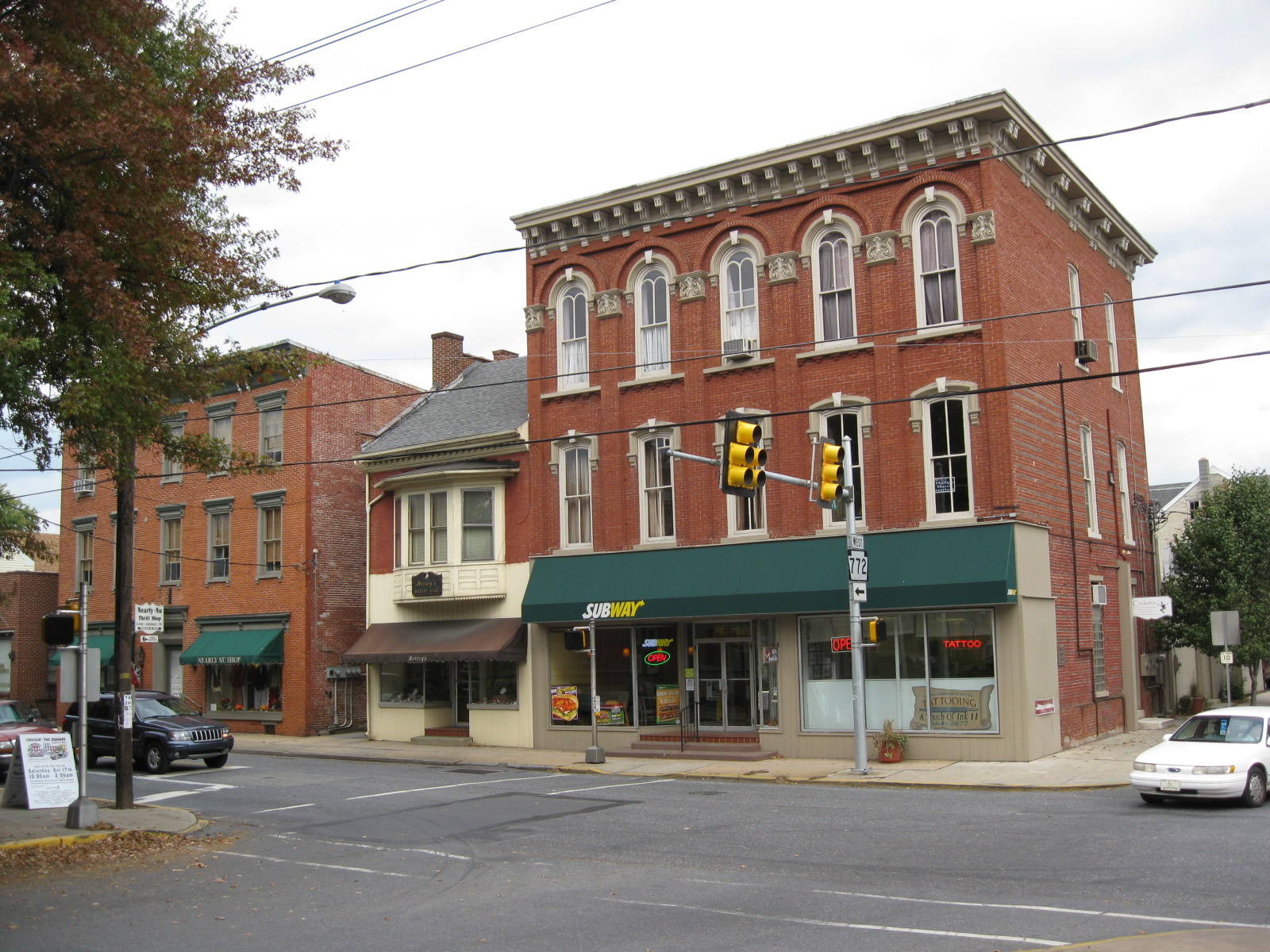
- Manheim, Pennsylvania

- Location in Lancaster County, Pennsylvania

- Location in Pennsylvania Location in the United States
- Coordinates: 40°09′45″N 76°23′47″W
- Country: United States
- State: Pennsylvania
- County: Lancaster
- Named for: Mannheim, Germany

Government
  - Mayor: Scot C. Funk (2013)

Area
  - Total: 1.40 sq mi (3.63 km^{2})
  - Land: 1.38 sq mi (3.58 km^{2})
  - Water: 0.015 sq mi (0.04 km^{2})
- Elevation: 407 ft (124 m)

Population (2020)
  - Total: 5,046
  - Density: 3,650.5/sq mi (1,409.45/km^{2})
- Time zone: UTC-5 (EST)
  - Summer (DST): UTC-4 (EDT)
- ZIP code: 17545
- Area codes: 717
- FIPS code: 42-46888
- Website: manheimboro.org

Manheim (Pennsylvania German: Mannem) is a borough in Lancaster County, Pennsylvania, United States. The population was 5,064 at the 2020 census. The borough was named after Mannheim, Germany.

== History ==
Manheim was laid out by Henry William Stiegel in 1762 on a land tract in Rapho Township, though it was only incorporated in 1838. He set out to build an industrial empire and founded the Manheim Glassworks. After financial failure, he was forced to sell the development in 1775. After several failed attempts at resurrecting the glassworks, it closed in 1780.

The first railroad train came into Manheim on January 1, 1862, with the completion of the first division of the Columbia and Reading Railroad. In 1884, another forward step was the laying of water pipes and the beginning of service by the Manheim Electric Company, which set up a plant in Bomberger's Mill at the end of Mill Street.

== Geography ==
Manheim is in northern Lancaster County, along Pennsylvania Route 72 (Main Street), 11 miles (18 km) northwest of Lancaster, the county seat, and 13 miles (21 km) south of Lebanon. Pennsylvania Route 772 also passes through the borough, leading east 5 miles (8 km) to Lititz and southwest 7 miles (11 km) to Mount Joy. Manheim is bordered to the west by Rapho Township and to the east by Penn Township.

According to the United States Census Bureau, the borough has a total area of 1.4 square miles (3.6 km^{2}), of which 0.02 square miles (0.04 km^{2}), or 1.24%, are water. Chiques Creek, a southwest-flowing tributary of the Susquehanna River, forms the eastern boundary of the borough.

Manheim has a hot-summer humid continental climate (Dfa) and average monthly temperatures range from 30.2 °F in January to 74.9 °F in July. The local hardiness zone is 6b.

== Demographics ==
Historical population
| Census | Pop. | Note | %± |
|---|---|---|---|
| 1850 | 778 | | — |
| 1860 | 856 | | 10.0% |
| 1870 | 1,122 | | 31.1% |
| 1880 | 1,666 | | 48.5% |
| 1890 | 2,070 | | 24.2% |
| 1900 | 2,019 | | −2.5% |
| 1910 | 2,202 | | 9.1% |
| 1920 | 2,712 | | 23.2% |
| 1930 | 3,520 | | 29.8% |
| 1940 | 3,831 | | 8.8% |
| 1950 | 4,246 | | 10.8% |
| 1960 | 4,790 | | 12.8% |
| 1970 | 5,434 | | 13.4% |
| 1980 | 5,015 | | −7.7% |
| 1990 | 5,011 | | −0.1% |
| 2000 | 4,784 | | −4.5% |
| 2010 | 4,858 | | 1.5% |
| 2020 | 5,046 | | 3.9% |
| 2021 (est.) | 5,039 | ▼ | −0.1% |

As of the census of 2000, there were 4,784 people, 1,989 households, and 1,362 families residing in the borough. The population density was 3,416.7 people per square mile (1,319.2 people/km^{2}). There were 2,075 housing units at an average density of 1,481.9 per square mile (572.2/km^{2}). The racial makeup of the borough was 96.38% White, 0.63% African American, 0.08% Native American, 1.00% Asian, 0.02% Pacific Islander, 0.61% from other races, and 1.28% from two or more races. Hispanic or Latino of any race were 1.69% of the population.

There were 1,989 households, out of which 30.6% had children under the age of 18 living with them, 53.6% were married couples living together, 10.7% had a female householder with no husband present, and 31.5% were non-families. 26.6% of all households were made up of individuals, and 11.2% had someone living alone who was 65 years of age or older. The average household size was 2.40 and the average family size was 2.88.

In the borough the population was spread out, with 24.6% under the age of 18, 7.8% from 18 to 24, 30.2% from 25 to 44, 20.9% from 45 to 64, and 16.4% who were 65 years of age or older. The median age was 38 years. For every 100 females there were 94.1 males. For every 100 females age 18 and over, there were 90.3 males.

The median income for a household in the borough was $41,855, and the median income for a family was $46,987. Males had a median income of $33,961 versus $21,792 for females. The per capita income for the borough was $21,276. About 4.1% of families and 5.3% of the population were below the poverty line, including 7.7% of those under age 18 and 5.8% of those age 65 or over.

== Arts and culture ==
The Manheim Community Farm Show is held the first week of every October at Memorial Park.

Stiegel Glassworks 1976 is a glass manufacturer named for Henry William Stiegel, a glassmaker and ironmaster who founded Manheim. Tours and an opportunity to create your own glassworks are available.

Manheim also holds a monthly First Thursdays event near the square from April through December. The family-friendly event features food trucks and free entertainment.

== Education ==
The borough is served by the Manheim Central School District and Manheim Central High School.

== Media ==
Manheim is covered by LancasterOnline and the Lititz Record Express; according to LNP Media Group, the Lititz Record covers local news for both Lititz and Manheim. Regional radio stations heard in the area include WRKY in Lancaster, WROZ in Lancaster, and WPPY in Starview.

== Notable people ==
Anna Balmer Myers, born in Manheim, authored several works depicting Lancaster County. Her I Lift My Lamp is a historical novel about the early settlement of the county, Henry William Stiegel and his glassworks in Manheim, a Mennonite Eby family, and the Ephrata Cloister.

Sarah Franklin Bache, daughter of Benjamin Franklin, moved to a home on the northeast corner of Market Square in Manheim during the British occupation of Philadelphia, during the Revolutionary War.

Others include:

- Robert Brubaker, opera singer
- Adam Cole, professional wrestler born and raised in Manheim
- Matt Greiner, founding member and drummer for the band August Burns Red
- Matt Nagy, Senior assistant and quarterback coach, NFL, Kansas City Chiefs
- William S. Rice, woodblock print artist who depicted the town in several of his works; born in Manheim

== See also ==
- Manheim Central School District
- Manheim Central High School
