= Henry William Stiegel =

American ironmaster (1729–1785)

- Born: Heinrich Wilhelm Stiegel; May 13, 1729; Cologne, Germany
- Died: January 10, 1785 (aged 55); Pennsylvania, United States
- Other name: 'Baron' Stiegel
- Citizenship: Germany; United States
- Occupations: Glassmaker, Ironmaster
- Years active: 1752 - 1774
- Spouses: Elizabeth Huber; Elizabeth Holtz

Henry William Stiegel (May 13, 1729, in Cologne, Germany – January 10, 1785, in Pennsylvania, USA) was a German-American glassmaker and ironmaster.

== Early life ==
Stiegel was the eldest of six children born to John Frederick and Dorothea Elizabeth Stiegel near the Free Imperial City of Cologne. He immigrated to British North America in 1750 with his mother and younger brother, Anthony (his father and other siblings had died). The Stiegels sailed on a ship known as the Nancy, and arrived in Philadelphia, Pennsylvania on August 31, 1750.

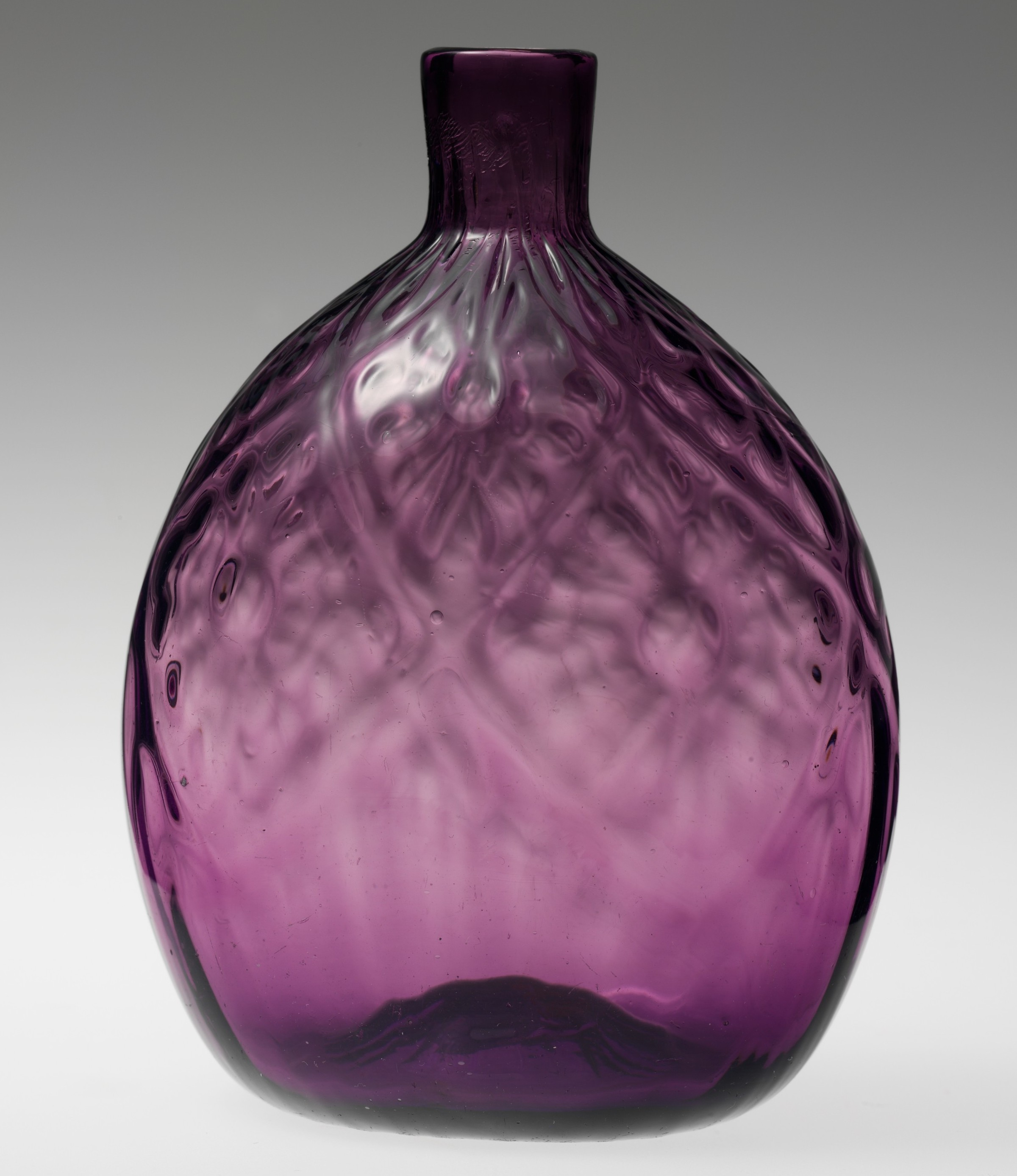
Pocket bottle attributed to Henry William Stiegel and the American Flint Glass Manufactory, 1769-1774

== Career ==
After arriving, Stiegel took a job in Philadelphia with Charles and Alexander Stedman, most likely as a clerk or bookkeeper. In 1752, Stiegel moved to what is now Lancaster County, Pennsylvania to work with Jacob Huber, an ironworker.

When Jacob Huber died in 1767, Stiegel and several business partners from Philadelphia assumed ownership of Huber's foundry and renamed it Elizabeth Furnace (in honor of his wife). Stiegel later purchased a forge in Berks County called the Tulpehocken Eisenhammer. He called the place Charming Forge, another iron forge near Lancaster.

== Personal life and death ==
Stiegel married Huber's daughter, eighteen-year-old Elizabeth, the same year. The couple had two daughters, Barbara (born 1756) and Elizabeth (born 1758). Elizabeth Huber Stiegel died on February 13, 1758, only ten days after giving birth to their second daughter. Stiegel married his second wife, Elizabeth Holtz, within a year. They had a son named Jacob.

An active lay Lutheran and associate of Henry Melchior Muhlenberg, he donated the land on which the Lutheran church in Manheim, Pennsylvania is now built. Stiegel was also a founding member of the German Society of Pennsylvania, formed in 1764 to aid newly arrived German immigrants. He led the fundraising efforts to secure the plot of land on which the Society's first building was eventually erected. Stiegel reportedly died in poverty.

== Legacy ==
In 1934 the Lancaster County Historical Society erected a memorial to Stiegel in Manheim, Pennsylvania.

=== "Stiegel-type" glass ===
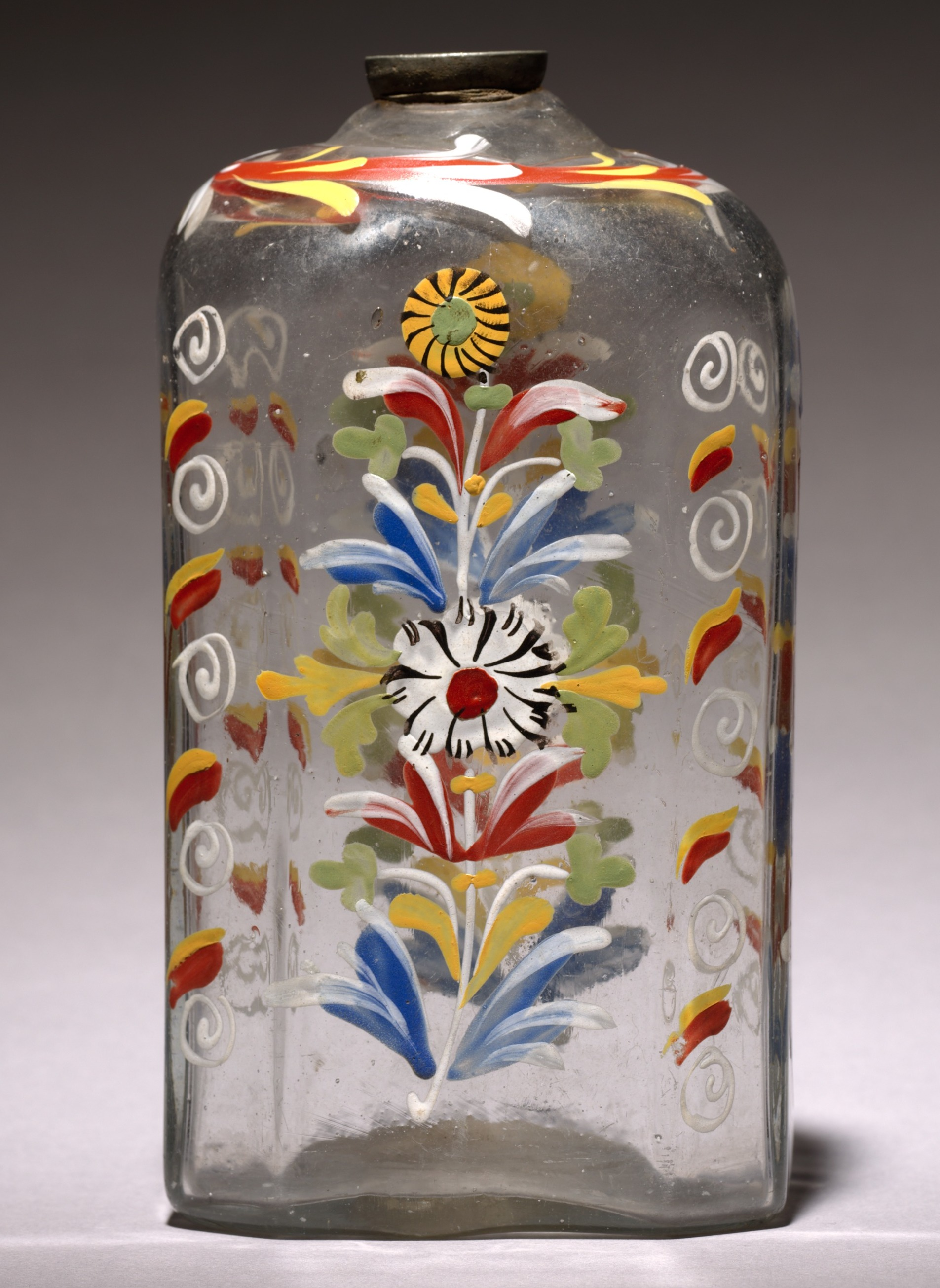
18th-century enameled bottle of the "Stiegel-type", in this case American.

Stiegel advertised "enameled glass" for sale, and while he apparently did produce some actual enameled glass in his factory, it was long thought that this referred to the brightly colored style of "peasant glass" produced in Bohemia, Germany and Switzerland, some of which was imported to America. This type, whether made in Europe or America, is still often called "Stiegel-type" glass in America, even though it is now thought that Stiegel's advertisements actually meant white milk glass or the use of twisting white canes within stemware, not true enameled glass. Etched clear glasses may also be called "Stiegel-type".

== See also ==
- 18th century glassmaking in the United States
