= Timothy Priestley =

English Independent minister

Timothy Priestley (19 June 1734 – 23 April 1814) was an English Independent minister. The younger brother of Joseph Priestley, he was a collaborator in making electrical apparatus.

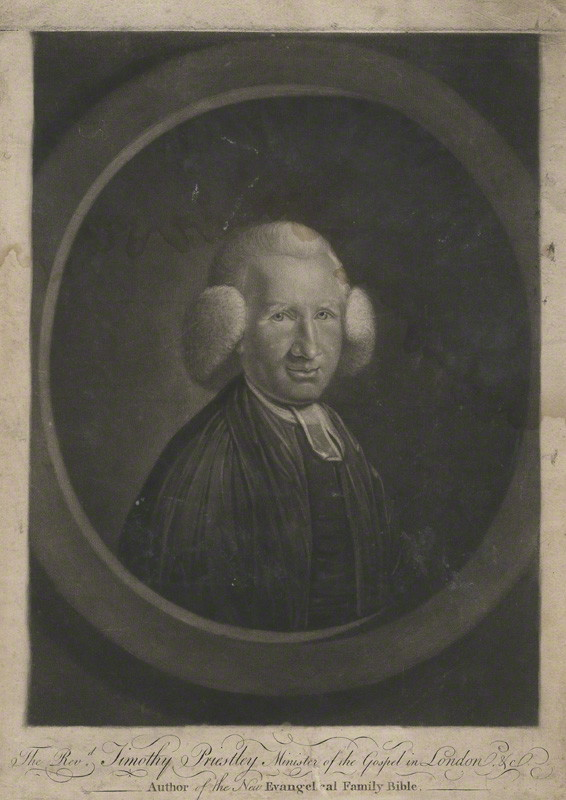
Timothy Priestley, 1792 engraving by Thomas Holloway.

== Life ==
The second child of Jonas and Mary Priestley, was born at Fieldhead in the parish of Birstall, Yorkshire, on 19 June 1734. He was brought up by his grandfather, Joseph Swift, and sent to school at Batley. For some time he was employed in his father's business as a cloth-dresser.

His elder brother Joseph Priestley, thought Timothy frivolous; but he received a religious direction from James Scott (1710-1783), who became minister of Upper Chapel, Heckmondwike in Yorkshire, in 1754. Scott in 1756 established a dissenting academy at Southfield, near Heckmondwike, and Timothy Priestley was the second young man who entered it as a student for the ministry. He got into trouble, however, by going out to preach without leave; and Joseph disparaged his training.

Timothy Priestley's preaching was popular, and he was employed in mission work at Ilkeston, Derbyshire, and elsewhere. In 1760 he was ordained pastor of the congregation at Kipping (later Kipping Chapel, Thornton), near Bradford, Yorkshire: an uncomfortable settlement because the owner of the Kipping estate having ceased to be in sympathy with nonconformity. Early in 1766 Priestley became minister of Hunter's Croft congregational church, Manchester, succeeding to the congregation of Caleb Warhurst. His chapel was enlarged during his ministry, where he was reputed for preaching and also eccentricity in the pulpit. Priestley was accused of "irregularities" amounting to trading to increase his salary, for example participation in "the liquor business" and making packing-cases on Sunday nights (he said he never began till the clock struck twelve).

Priestley refused to join the petitions (1772-3) for relaxation of the Toleration Act, except on the condition that concealment of heresy should be made a capital offence. In 1774 he was in London, preaching at Whitefield's Tabernacle, Moorfields. In 1782 the two Priestleys were appointed to preach the "double lecture" (24 August) at Oldbury, Worcestershire; Joseph wished his brother to decline, and on his refusal to give way, himself withdrew, his place being taken by Habakkuk Crabb.

Priestley's Manchester ministry terminated in his formal dismissal on 14 April 1784, only two hands being held up in his favour. He moved to Dublin, where he remained about two years. He then received a call to succeed Richard Woodgate (d. 28 June 1787) as minister of Jewin Street independent church, London. Here he remained till his death.

Priestley died at Islington on 23 April 1814, and was buried at Bunhill Fields on 29 April. His funeral sermon was preached by George Burder.

== Scientific apparatus ==
Timothy Priestley made electrical machines for sale, under Joseph's directions, and constructed for his brother an electrical kite, 6 feet 4 inches wide, which folded up so as to be carried like a fishing-rod. This kite was mentioned by Joseph in his correspondence with John Canton. The electrical collaboration dated back to Joseph's vacations from Daventry Academy, when the brothers studied science together from encyclopedias, for example the Dictionary of Arts and Sciences of John Barrow. They worked on electrostatics, discharging electrical charges through iron. The machine design was for electrostatic purposes, and Timothy had lathe and other skills for the actual construction.

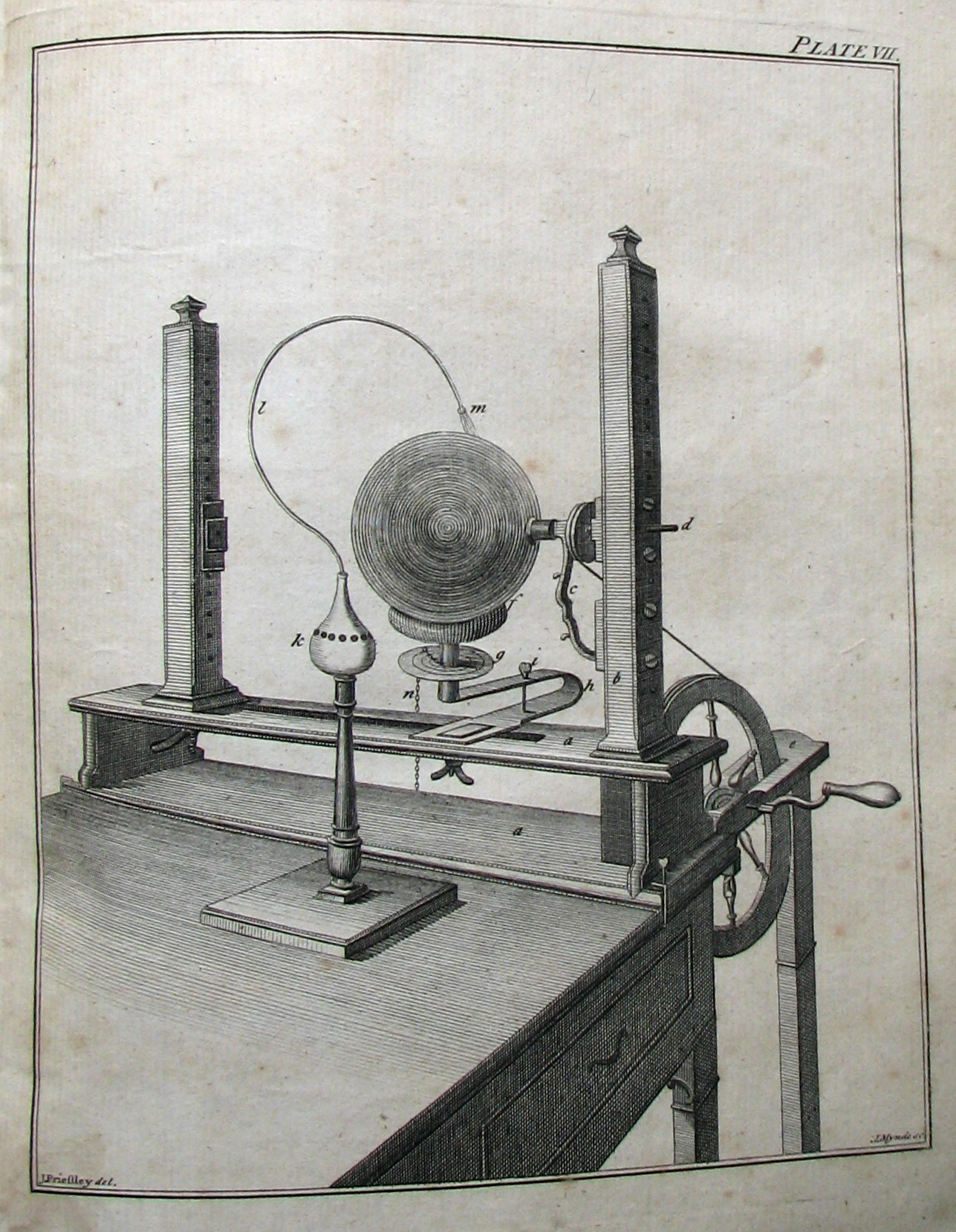
Priestley electrical machine. Illustration in the first edition of Joseph Priestley's Familiar Introduction to Electricity (1768)

A market for these machines was created by Joseph's History and Present State of Electricity (1767). Design details were given in John Imison's The School of Arts (1785), and later in the Encyclopædia Britannica.

One such machine survived and was put on display in 1860 at Burlington House by James Yates, part of a display of Priestley memorabilia. It had been bequeathed by Dr. Robert Cappe to John Bostock. Cappe's machine was bought for therapeutic purposes at Leeds General Infirmary, where William Hey supported the treatment; Timothy Priestley was paid £5 11s. 6d. for it.

== Works ==
Priestley issued a periodical, The Christian's Magazine, or Gospel Repository, designed to counteract Unitarianism (three volumes, 1790-2); the first volume is dedicated to Selina, Countess of Huntingdon, a friend. It contained a biography of Scott, his tutor, which was reprinted in 1791.

On his brother Joseph's death he preached at Jewin Street, 29 April 1804, and printed (1804) a funeral sermon, with appendix of anecdotes, the authenticity of some of which has been disputed. The sermon was designed to vindicate his own Calvinistic Methodism. The elder John Aikin was the subject of one of these anecdotes, and the scene painted, which was disputed by John Aikin the son, has been likened to a Methodist conversion narrative.

His advertised Animadversions on his brother's theological views do not seem to have been published. Their differences are known from letters Timothy wrote to their Aunt Sarah.

He published also:

- an annotated Family Bible, 1793?; 1804, 2 vols (the commentary that of The Christian's New and Complete Universal Family Bible of c. 1790);
- the Christian's Looking-Glass, 1790-2;
- Family Exercises, 1792;

and a few single sermons.

Priestley was attacked by the polemicist William Huntington.

== Family ==
Priestley's wife Anne died in 1793 at age 47. His son William (1768-1827) was independent minister at Fordingbridge, Hampshire.
