= Wistarburg Glass Works =

Glass factory

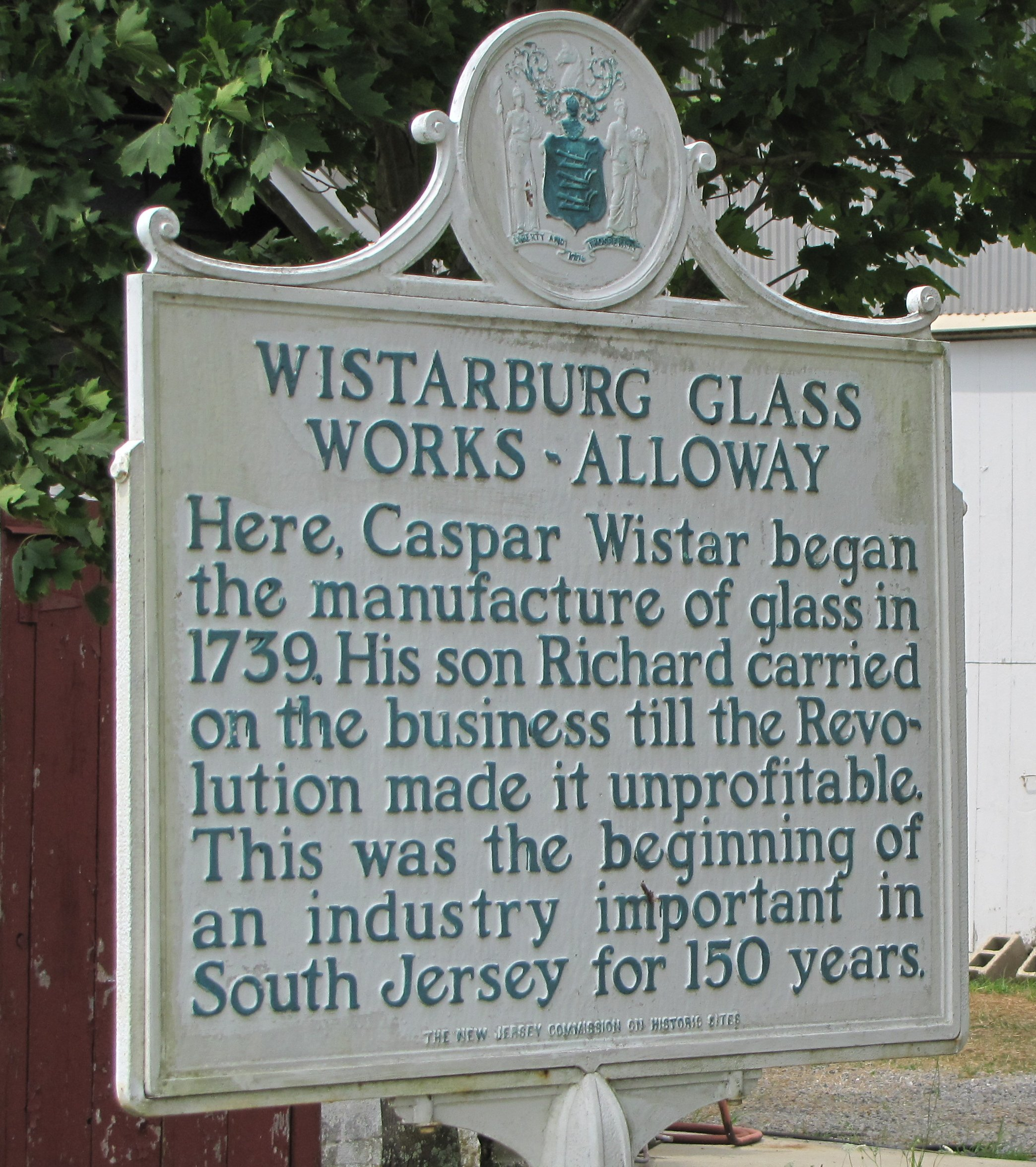
Wistarburg Glass Works roadsign

The Wistarburg Glass Works (sometimes spelled Wistarburgh Glass Works; also known as the United Glass Company) was the first successful glass factory and joint-venture enterprise in the Thirteen Colonies. Caspar Wistar founded the glass works company in 1739. He began by recruiting experienced glass artisans from Europe, and built homes for the workers along with a mansion for the factory's foreman. Wistar also had a company store built near the factory.

The village that developed around the factory adopted Wistar's name, and became known as Wistarburg. The village was in Salem County, New Jersey, in the township of Alloway. Wistar's factory produced thousands of glass bottles per year, as well as window glass. Wistar was a friend of Benjamin Franklin, and made glass globes for Franklin's electricity-producing machines used for scientific research. Wistar's son inherited the business and his son, Wistar's grandson, eventually gained control of the company, but owing to his mismanagement it closed.

== Company foundation ==
Caspar Wistar (1696–1752) emigrated from the Palatinate region of Germany to Philadelphia in 1717. There he began making brass buttons, which he would take with him on sales visits to Salem County, New Jersey. On one such trip he noticed that the township of Alloway had an abundant supply of the necessary materials for glass manufacture – white sand, clay, wood, and accessible waterways of the nearby Deep Run and Alloway Creek rivers for transporting raw materials in and finished products out. He was thus encouraged to establish a glass factory there. Wistar's was not the first to be built in colonial America. Earlier establishments had been set up at Jamestown, Virginia, in 1607 and 1621. They were founded to export glass items to England, but ultimately failed, having produced little, if any, glass.

Wistar's button-making business proved to be a success, and together with his gains from speculating in land allowed him to accumulate sufficient capital to fund a new enterprise. He began his glass-making venture in 1737 by buying 2,000 acres (810 ha) of land about eight miles (13 km) from Salem, New Jersey, and commenced construction of his factory – which became the first commercially successful glass factory in America. He arranged in January 1738 to lease 50 acres (20 ha) of land containing 18,000 cords (65,000 m^{3}) of wood from John Ladd, a local landowner. Wistar then recruited four experienced glass makers from the Palatinate region of Germany – C. Halter, S. Griessmeyer, J. Wentzel, and J. Halter – to make the factory operational. He organized a joint venture with them, dividing profits in exchange for the art of glass making. The four artisans were to teach this art to the Wistars and nobody else in the colonies. Wistar had arranged for their journey to America, and they arrived in Philadelphia from Rotterdam on the ship Two Sisters in September 1738. (Note: There are no historical records that tell whether the two Halters were related.)

Wistar had houses built near the factory to rent for the key artisans and other workers that were usually indentured immigrants. He also had a mansion constructed for the factory's foreman, which also served as a lodging and office for Wistar while on his visits to the factory from his home in Philadelphia. A company store was constructed for the workers' needs. Products could be purchased on credit against the glass a worker would make in the future; a bookkeeper was employed to keep track of the store accounts and housing rents. The store also served the people of the village of Alloway, and was the center of community life.

== Joint venture ==
Wistar entered into a profit-sharing arrangement with the four German artisans who had helped to make his new factory operational. To ensure their continuing support, he set up a joint venture among five members, the first cooperative manufacturing joint-venture business in America and the first long-term successful glasshouse. The 1739 company began trading as the United Glass Company, which consisted of three individual joint ventures. Wistar was the general manager and primary share holder, with a two-thirds majority ownership in each of the joint ventures. The four Germans held one-third ownership and shared the expenses, assets, and profits of the three individual joint ventures. The first entity under the umbrella enterprise was held between Wistar and Wentzel, the second between Wistar and C. Halter, and the third between Wistar, Griesmeyer and J. Halter. The joint venture arrangement remained in effect until Wistar's death in 1752.

== History ==
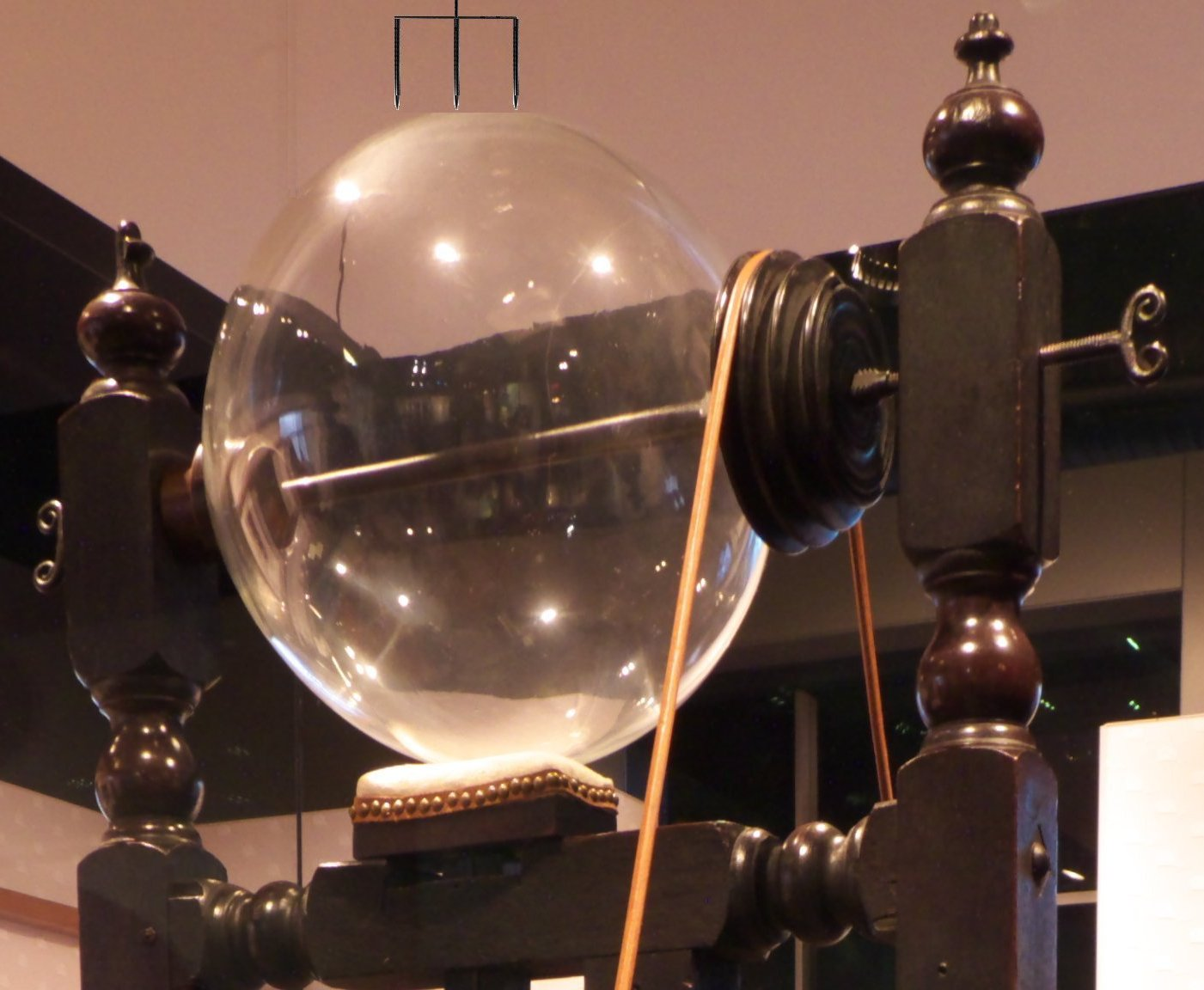
Glass globes for Benjamin Franklin's electrostatic machines were made by Wistarburg Glass Works.

Wistar's factory produced about 15,000 glass bottles per year made in the Waldglas style, which had been a way of making glass in Europe since the Middle Ages. It was an inexpensive traditional method whereby the main materials of wood ash and sand produced a greenish-yellow glass. The factory produced window glass and was the first American supplier for the thirteen colonies. The Glass House (as it was often called) also produced rum flasks and tableware. Wistar had unlimited access to white silica sand, as well as other necessary materials, and the company's success was further aided by New Jersey's low taxation; Wistar was easily able to obtain more assets for the business.

Wistar lived in Philadelphia, and was aware that the British did not allow the manufacture of certain items that were in competition with those imported from Britain. He therefore downplayed the profits from his glass business, so as to avoid arousing the suspicions of the British. Wistar ran his business affairs from Philadelphia, spending little time in Alloway. He sold the manufactured glass products through his store in Philadelphia, the Wistarburg company store, and his son Richard's store in New York City.

Wistar was friends with Benjamin Franklin of Philadelphia and made glass globes for Franklin's electricity producing machines, used for scientific research into electricity. Franklin built several of his machines, using the Wistarburg glass globes, for Cadwallader Colden and Lewis Evans, for which they paid him between ten and twelve pounds each. The Wistarburg Glass Works also made glass tubes for David Rittenhouse to use in his experiments on electricity.

Wistar died of dropsy in Philadelphia on March 21, 1752, and his son Richard took over the glass works. Richard also mostly ran the business from Philadelphia, but worked on increasing sales and expanding the company's product range. Just like his father, he relied on hired artisans to run the glass works factory in Alloway. The glass enterprise continued into the 1770s, but struggled owing to deforestation around Wistarburg. Wood from the trees was needed as fuel to run the glass furnaces, and when supplies began to run short some of the company's key artisans resigned and went to start their own glass company in Glassboro, New Jersey, where there were new uncut forests and plenty of wood. Richard also had personal problems that occupied much of his time, and financial difficulties caused by the Revolutionary War; in an attempt to make ends meet, he sold a major portion of his father's New Jersey real estate. Richard died in 1781, and his son John took over the business. John failed to devote the effort necessary to run the glass works, allowing it to go into serious decline and ultimately it went out of business. The final year of the enterprise is disputed by scholars, but it is known that in 1793 the property that the factory was on was divided up among Richard's heirs and sold in parcels.

== See also ==
- 18th century glassmaking in the United States
