= Franklin's electrostatic machine =

Experimental device

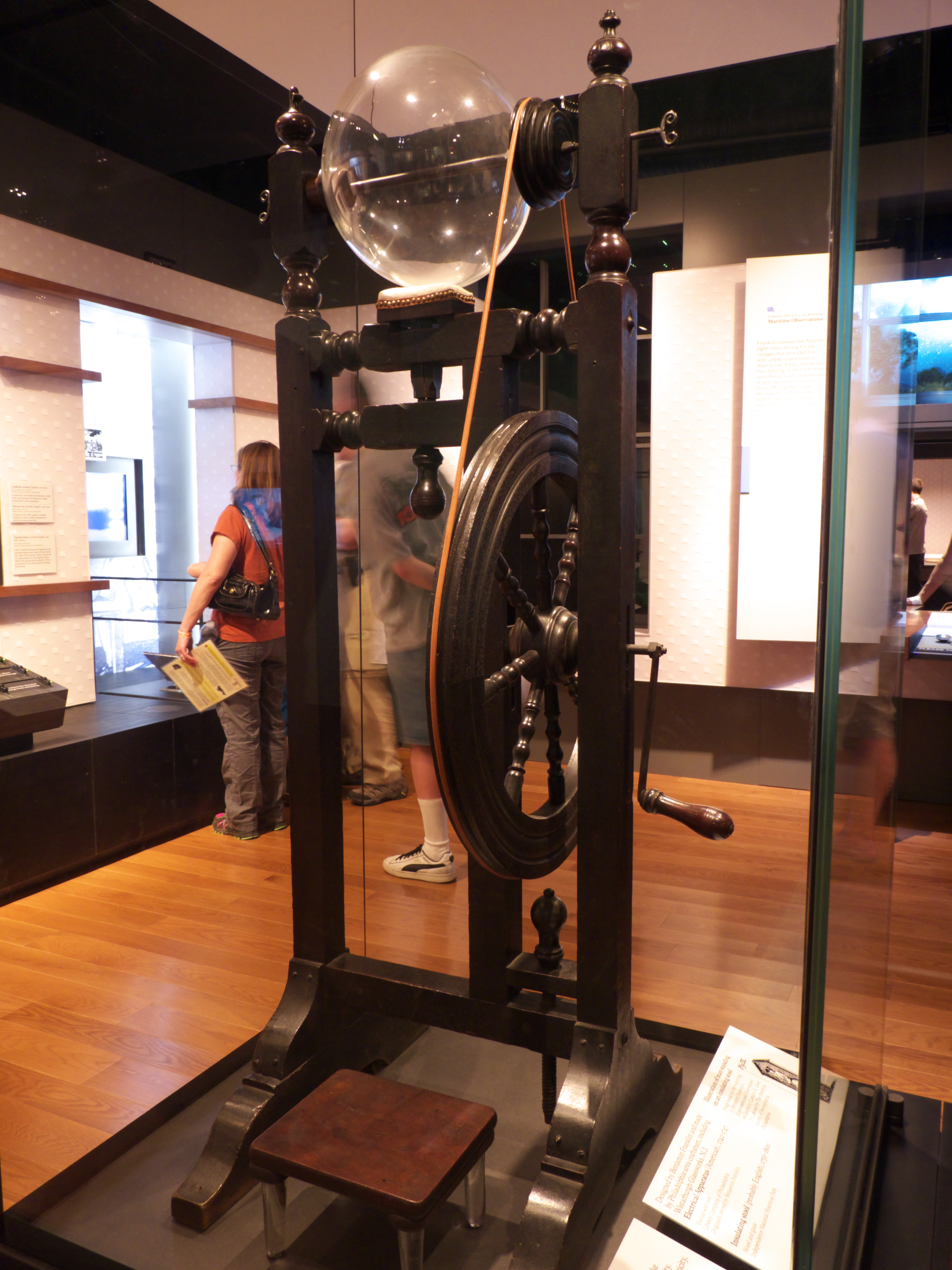
- The electrostatic machine used by Benjamin Franklin, featuring a rotating glass globe and hand crank.
- Type: Electrostatic generator
- Material: Glass globe, walnut wood frame, iron axel/crank, leather/cloth pad
- Created: c. 1742–1747
- Period/culture: Colonial America / Age of Enlightenment
- Place: Philadelphia, Pennsylvania
- Present location: The Franklin Institute, Philadelphia, Pennsylvania
- fi.edu

Franklin's electrostatic machine is a high-voltage static electricity-generating device used by Benjamin Franklin in the mid-18th century for research into electrical phenomena. Its key components are a glass globe which turned on an axis via a crank, a cloth pad in contact with the spinning globe, a set of metal needles to conduct away the charge developed on the globe by its friction with the pad, and a Leyden jar – a high-voltage capacitor – to accumulate the charge. Franklin's experiments with the machine eventually led to new theories about electricity and inventing the lightning rod.

== Background ==
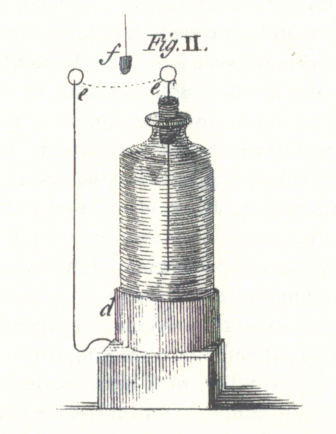
Leyden jar experiment

Franklin was not the first to build an electrostatic generator. European scientists developed machines to generate static electricity decades earlier. In 1663, Otto von Guericke generated static electricity with a device that used a sphere of sulfur. Francis Hauksbee developed a more advanced electrostatic generator around 1704 using a glass bulb that had a vacuum. He later replaced the globe with a glass tube of about 2.5 feet (0.76 m) emptied of air. The glass tube was a less effective static generator than the globe, but it became more popular because it was easier to use.

Machines that generated static electricity with a glass disc were popular and widespread in Europe by 1740. In 1745, German cleric Ewald Georg von Kleist and Dutch scientist Pieter van Musschenbroek discovered independently that the electric charge from these machines could be stored in a Leyden jar, named after the city of Leiden in the Netherlands.

In 1745, Peter Collinson, a businessman from London who corresponded with American and European scientists, donated a German "glass tube" along with instructions how to make static electricity, to Franklin's Library Company of Philadelphia. Collinson was the library's London agent and provided the latest technology news from Europe. Franklin wrote a letter to Collinson on March 28, 1747, thanking him, and saying the tube and instructions had motivated several colleagues and him to begin serious experiments with electricity.

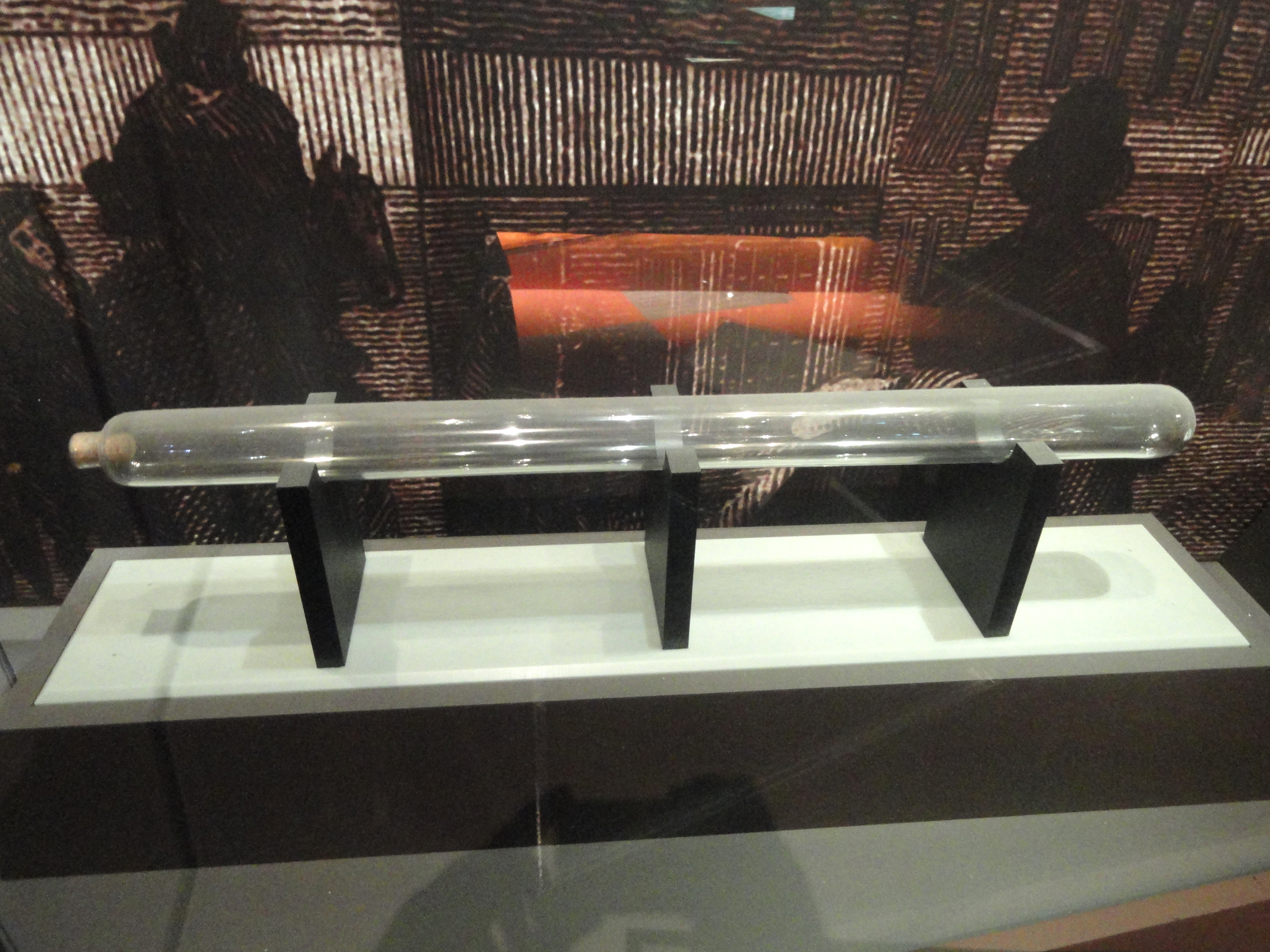
Collinson gift of "glass tube" used for producing static electricity

In 1746, Franklin began working on electrical experiments with Ebenezer Kinnersley after he bought all of Archibald Spencer's electrical equipment that he used in his lectures. Later, he was also associated with Thomas Hopkinson and Philip Syng in experimentation with electricity. In the summer of 1747 they had received an electrical system from Thomas Penn. While no records exists to tell exactly what parts were included in the system, historian J. A. Leo LeMay believes it was a combination of an electricity generating machine, a Leyden jar, a glass tube, and a stool that was electrically insulated from the ground. This gave Franklin a complete system to experiment with generating and storing electricity.

When amber, sulfur, or glass are rubbed with certain materials, they produce electrical effects. Franklin theorized this "electrical fire" was collected from this other material somehow, and not produced by the friction on the object. He decided to retire early from his printing business, still in his early forties, to spend more time studying electricity. In 1748, Franklin turned over his entire printing business to his partner David Hall. He moved into a new Philadelphia home with his wife, where he built a laboratory to conduct experiments and research new electrical theories. Franklin experimented not only with the electrostatic machine with the glass globe, but also with the Leyden jar. He kept a detailed journal of his research in a diary called "Electrical Minutes" that has since been lost. Franklin's machine was given to Library Company of Philadelphia by Franklin's grandson in 1792, and is currently on display at the Franklin Institute.

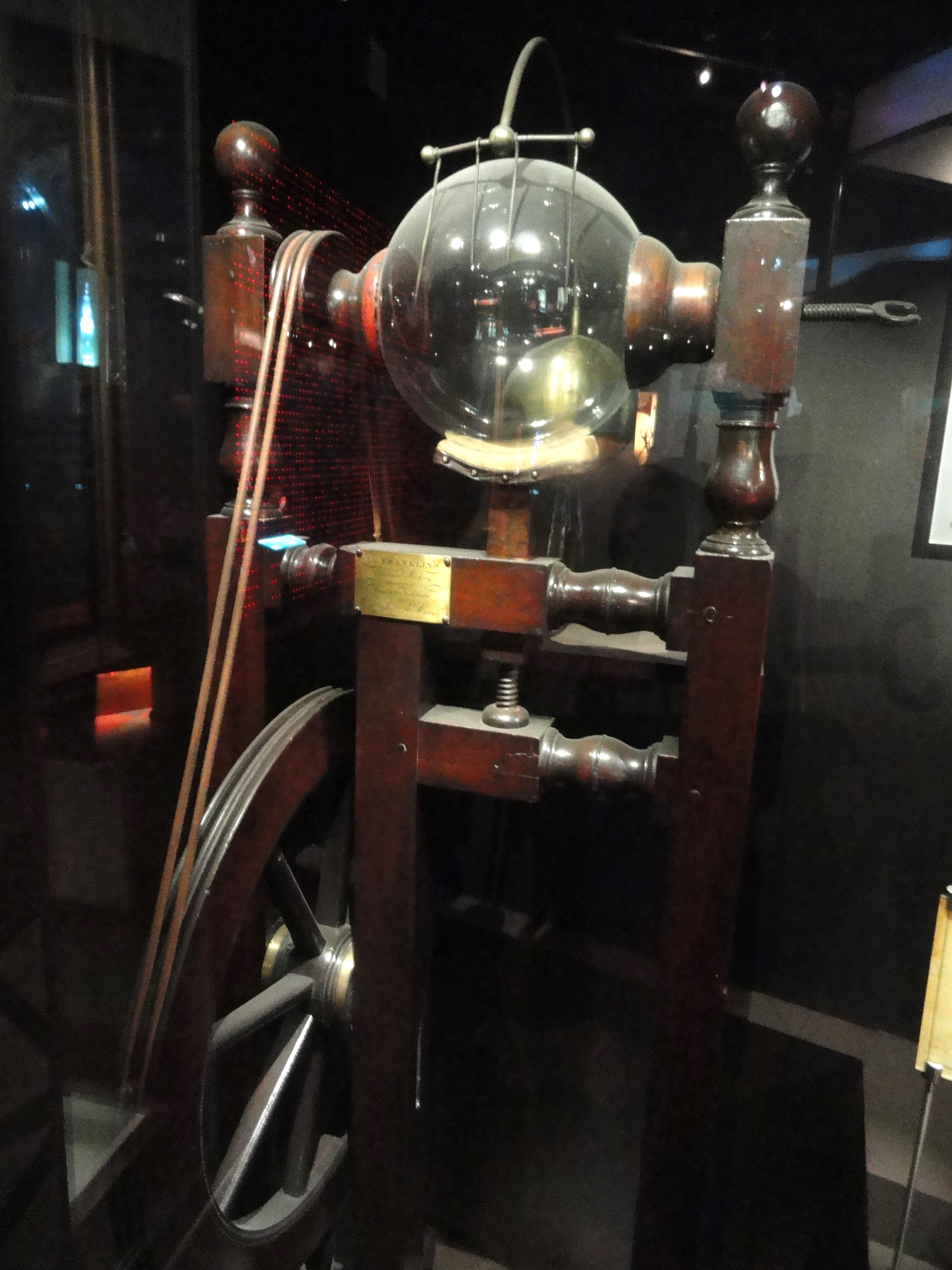
The glass globe spinning against the bottom pad develops static charge, which is conducted away by metal needles at top.

== Description ==
Franklin's machine used a belt and pulley system that could be operated by one person turning a crank. A large pulley was attached to the crank handle, and a much smaller pulley was attached to a large glass globe. An iron axle passed through the globe. This allowed the globe to be rotated at high speed. When the crank was turned, the glass globe rubbed against a leather pad, which generated a large static charge, similar to the electrical charge that could be created by rubbing a glass tube with wool cloth by hand. The machine was unique improvement over others made in Europe at the time, as the glass globe could be spun faster with much less labor. A few revolutions of the handle were all that were needed to charge a Leyden jar.

The electricity produced by the machine, in the form of sparks, passed through a set of metal needles positioned close to the spinning globe. The electric charge continued passing through a beaded iron chain, which acted as a conductor, to a Leyden jar that received the electricity. Franklin called the sparks produced by the machine "electrical fire".

The glass globes, known as "electerizing globes", were made of glass that was scientifically designed to produce static electricity effectively. Franklin specified the materials to be used in the glass formula, and the globes were manufactured by Caspar Wistar, a close associate of Franklin. Wistarburgh Glass Works also made scientific glass for the Leyden jars Franklin used in the 1750s.

== Electrical principles ==
Franklin's experiments with Leyden jars progressed to connecting several Leyden jars together in a series, with "one hanging on the tail of the other". All of the jars in the series could be charged simultaneously, which multiplied the electrical effect. A similar apparatus had been created earlier by Daniel Gralath. Franklin called this device an "electrical battery", but that term later came to have a different meaning, referring instead to a set of one or more galvanic cells. At that time, the word "battery" was a military term for a group of cannons. Franklin was the first to apply the terms "positive" and "negative" to electricity.

Through his research, Franklin was among first to prove the electrical principal of conservation of charge in 1747: a similar discovery was made independently in 1746 by William Watson. Franklin wrote detailed letters and documents about his experiments with the electrostatic machine and Leyden jars. In 1749, Franklin made a list of several ways in which lightning was similar to electricity. He concluded that lightning was essentially nothing more than giant electric sparks, similar to the sparks from the static charges produced by his electrostatic machine. He referred to static electricity as "electric fire", "electric matter", or "electric fluid". The term "electric fluid" was based on the idea that a jar could be filled and refilled when it became empty. That led to the revolutionary idea of "electrical fire" as a type of motion or current flow rather than a type of explosion.

Several 18th-century electric terms were derived from his name. For example, static electricity was known as "Franklin current", and "Franklinization" is a form of electrotherapy where Franklin shocked patients with strong static charges, to treat patients with various illnesses.

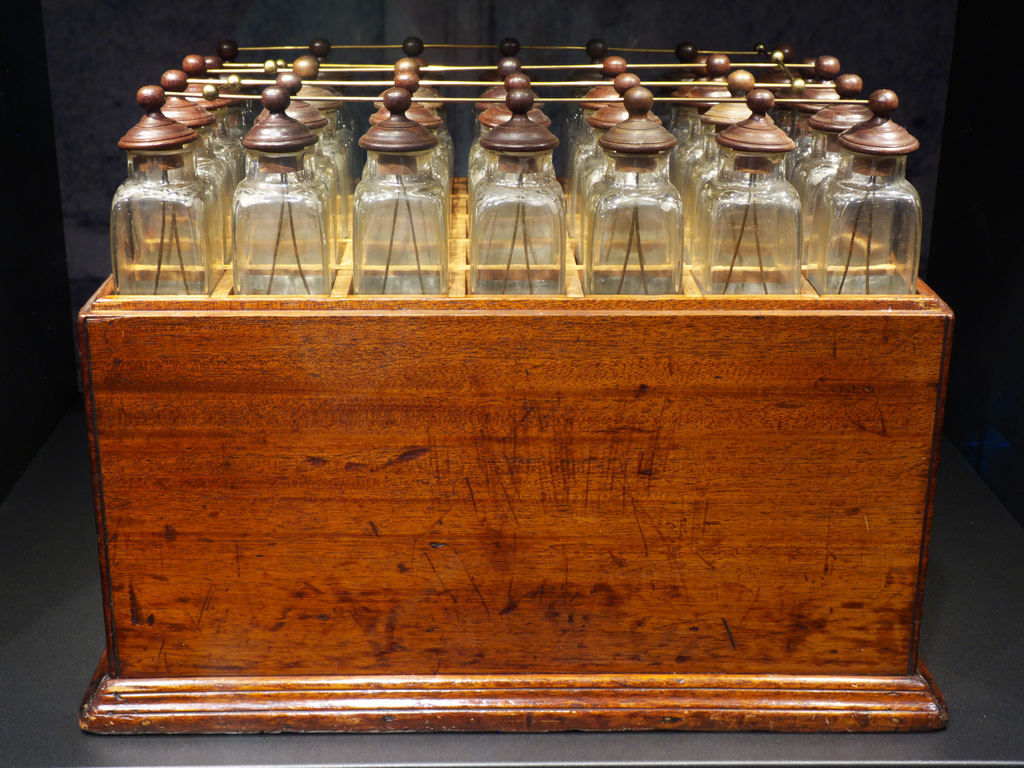
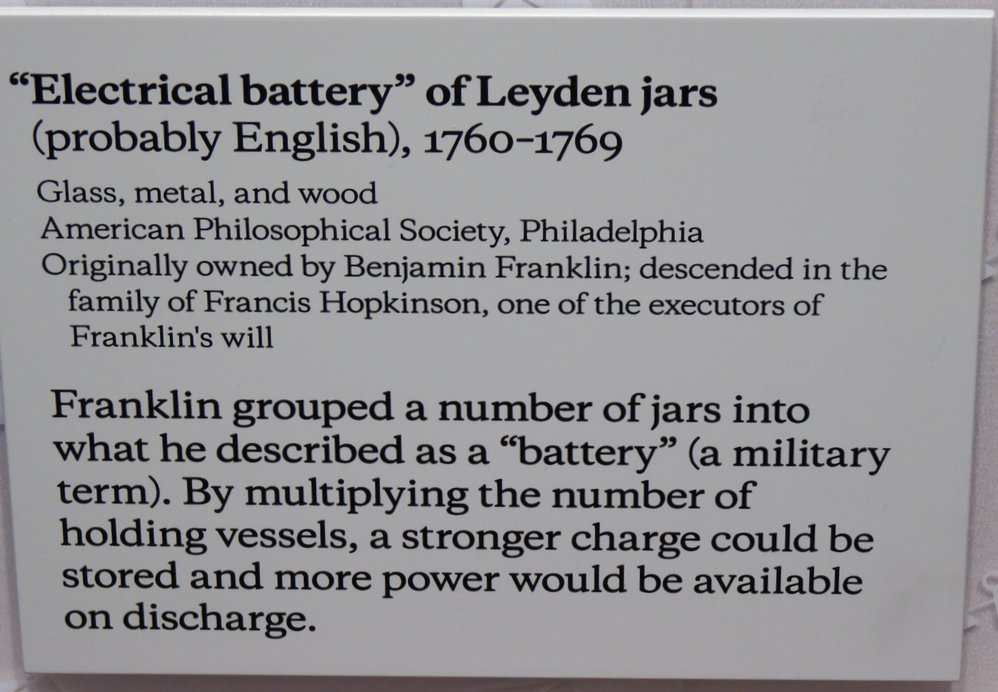
Leyden jar battery at the Franklin Institute science museum and the associated museum label that is below it

== Lightning rod invention ==
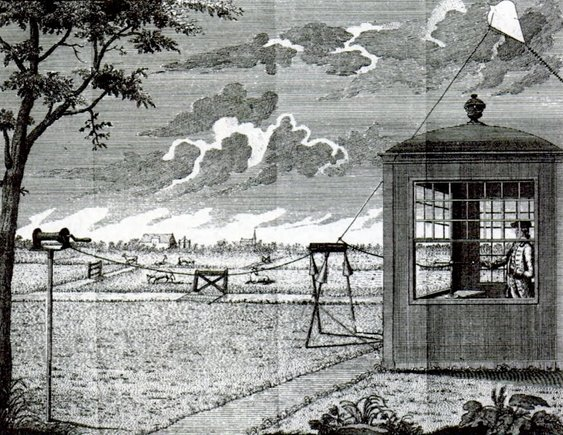
Kite apparatus for safe study of atmospheric electricity and lightning

Franklin invented the lightning rod based on what he learned from experiments with his electrostatic machine. Franklin and his associates observed that pointed objects were more effective than blunt objects at "drawing off" and "throwing off" sparks from static electricity. This discovery was first reported by Hopkinson. Franklin wondered if this discovery could be used in a practical invention. He thought something could be made to attract the electricity out of storm clouds, but first he had to verify that lightning bolts really are giant electric sparks. He wrote Collinson and Cadwallader Colden letters about this theory, and he described the kite experiment in the October 19, 1752 issue of the Pennsylvania Gazette. (Tom Tucker of the Isothermal Community College doubts the account, however, because of ambiguities in the account and points that out in his book Bolt of Fate: Benjamin Franklin and his Electric Kite Hoax. Others disagree with this view, arguing that Franklin would not make up such a fake story because he valued the integrity of the scientific community.)

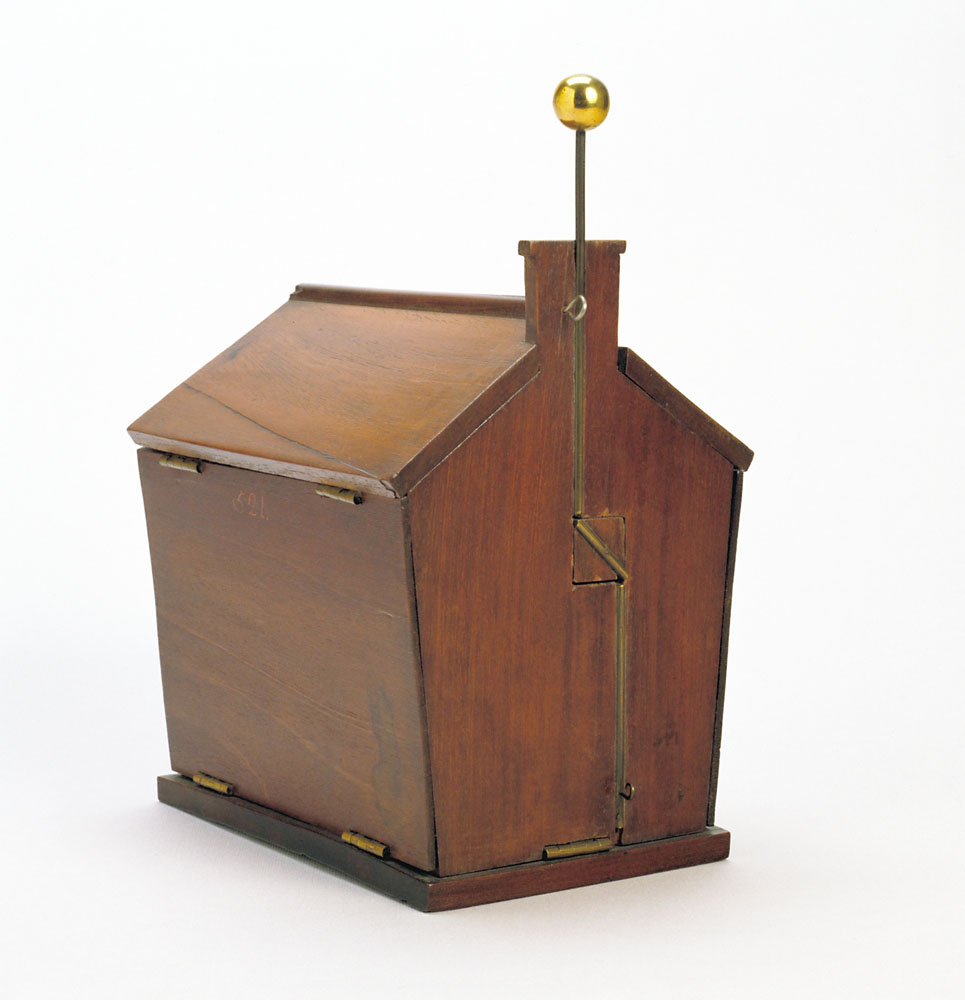
A "thunder house" example

To test his theory, Franklin proposed a potentially deadly experiment, to be performed during an electrical storm, where a person would stand on an insulated stool inside a sentry box, and hold out a long, pointed iron rod to attract a lightning bolt. A similar but less dangerous version of this experiment was first performed successfully in France On May 10, 1752, and later repeated several more times throughout Europe, though after a fatality in 1753 it was less frequently tried. Franklin declared that this "sentry-box experiment" showed that lightning and electricity were one and the same.

Franklin realized that wooden buildings could be protected from lightning strikes, and the deadly fires that often resulted, by placing a pointed iron on a rooftop, with the other end of the rod placed deep into the ground. The sharp point of the lightning rod would attract the electrical discharge from the cloud, and the lightning bolt would hit the iron rod instead of the wooden building. The electric charge from the lightning would flow through the rod directly into the earth, bypassing the structure, and preventing a fire.

Franklin's friend Kinnersley traveled throughout the eastern United States in the 1750s demonstrating man-made "lightning" on model thunder houses to show a how an iron rod placed into the ground would protect a wooden structure. He explained that lightning followed the same principles as the sparks from Franklin's electrostatic machine. These lectures by Kinnersley were widely advertised, and were one of the ways Franklin's lightning rod was demonstrated to the general public.

== Legacy ==
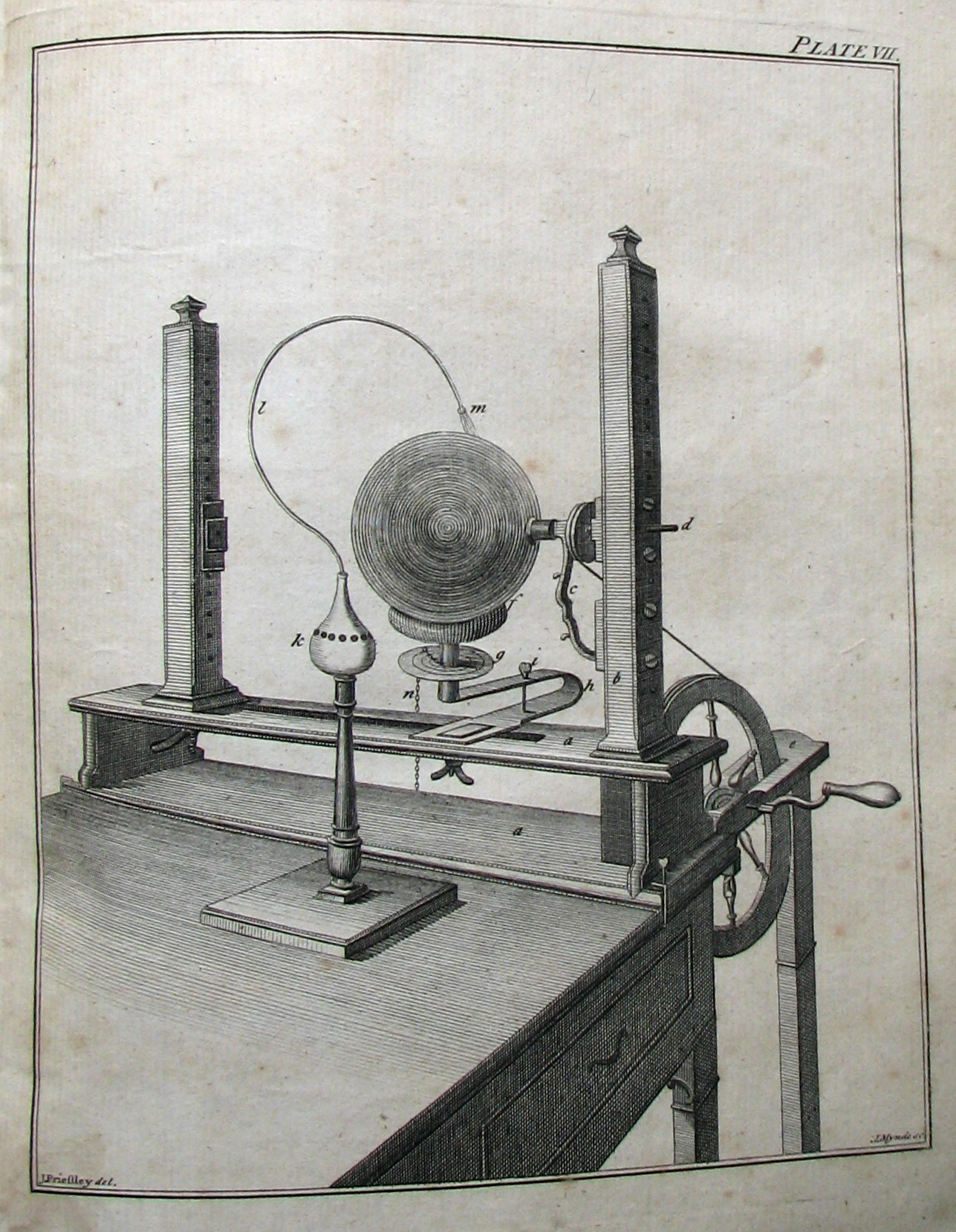
One of Joseph Priestley's "electrostatic machines"

Franklin distributed copies of the electrostatic machine to many of his close associates to encourage them to study electricity. Between 1747 and 1750, Franklin sent many letters to his friend Collinson in London about his experiments with the electrostatic machine and the Leyden jar, including his observations and theories on the principles of electricity. These letters were collected and published in 1751 in a book entitled Experiments and Observations on Electricity.

While Joseph Priestley was writing about the history of electricity, Franklin encouraged him to use an electrostatic machine to perform the experiments he was writing about. Priestly designed and used his own variations of Franklin's machine. While replicating the electrical experiments, some unanswered questions prompted Priestly to design additional experiments, leading to additional discoveries. In 1767, he published a 700-page book on his findings called The History and Present State of Electricity.

Eighteenth-century scientific laboratories usually contained some form of hand-operated electrostatic machine. Italian scientist Luigi Galvani had an electrostatic generator in his laboratory, where experiments with frog legs led him to conclude that animals generated a vital force, an animal electricity. Another Italian scientist, Alessandro Volta, disagreed with Galvani's claim that the electrical effects were due to something peculiar to living matter, and he demonstrated that electricity can be generated merely by placing wet, salty material in between two different metals. This led directly to the invention of the first practical electric battery, the voltaic pile.

After Franklin's death, two iconic artifacts from his research, the original "battery" of Leyden jars, and the "glass tube" that was a gift from Collinson in 1747, were given to the Royal Society in 1836 by Thomas Hopkinson's grandson Joseph Hopkinson, in accordance with Franklin's will.

== See also ==
- Wistarburgh Glass Works
- Corbett's electrostatic machine
- Van de Graaff generator
