= Pustular bacterid =

- Specialty: Dermatology

Pustular bacterid is a skin condition characterized by a symmetric, grouped, vesicular or pustular eruption on the palms and soles marked by exacerbations and remissions over long periods of time.

== See also ==
- List of cutaneous conditions
