= Relapsing–remitting =

Medical symptoms which cyclically worsen and improve with time

Relapsing–remitting is a medical term referring to a presentation of disease symptoms that become worse over time (relapsing), followed by periods of less severe symptoms that do not completely cease (partial remitting). The term is used to describe a type of multiple sclerosis called relapsing–remitting multiple sclerosis, where unpredictable relapses are followed by remission for months to years.

The term is also used to describe palindromic rheumatism in the context of rheumatoid arthritis, catatonia, lupus, mental disorders, and experimental autoimmune encephalomyelitis.
