= Benjamin Franklin Drawing Electricity from the Sky =

Painting by Benjamin West

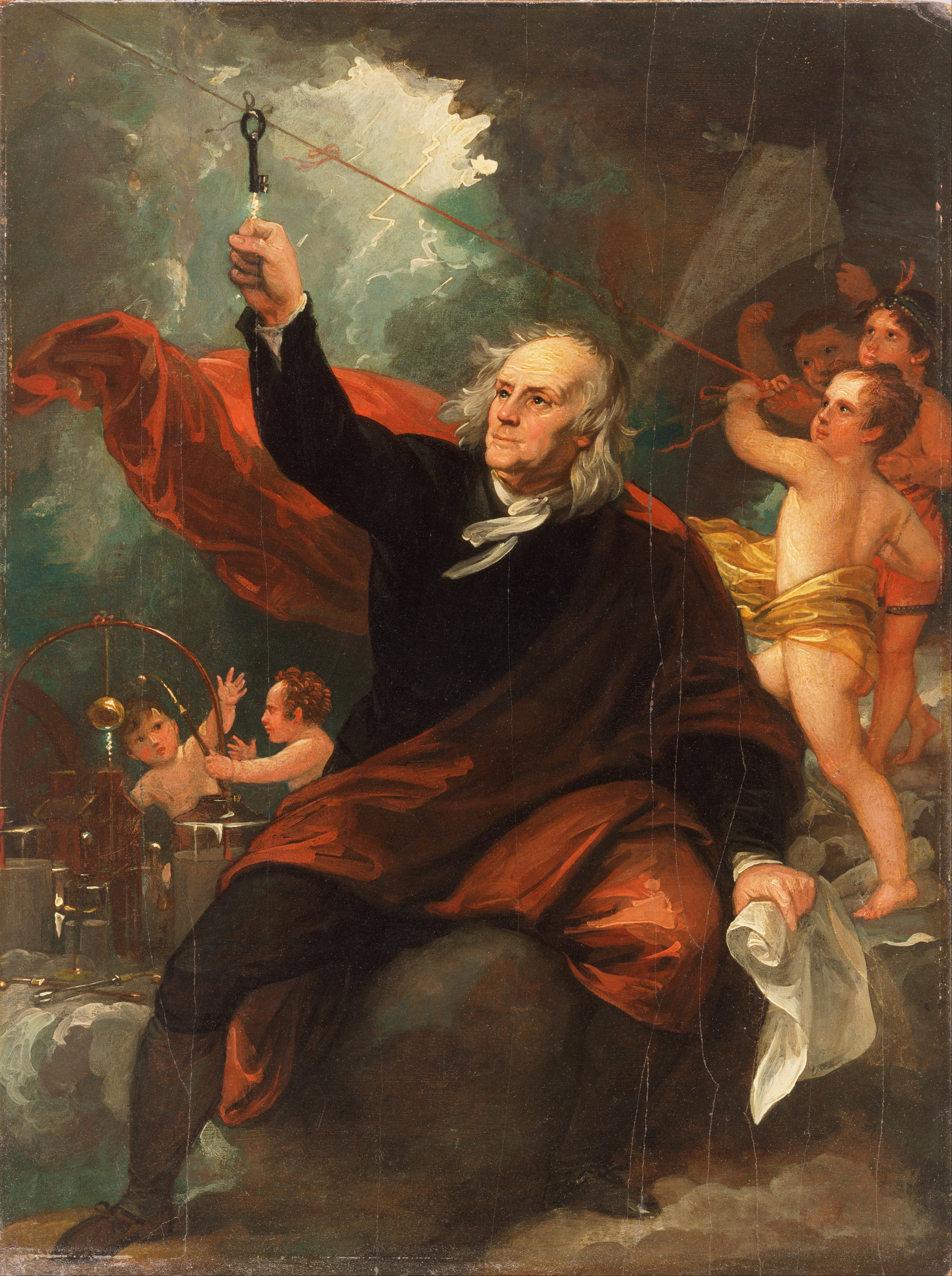
- Artist: Benjamin West
- Completion date: 1816
- Medium: Oil on slate
- Dimensions: 13 3/8 x 10 1/16 inches (34 x 25.6 cm)
- Location: Philadelphia Museum of Art, Philadelphia

Benjamin Franklin Drawing Electricity from the Sky is a c. 1805 painting by Benjamin West in the Philadelphia Museum of Art. It depicts American Founding Father Benjamin Franklin conducting his kite experiment in 1752 to ascertain the electrical nature of lightning. West composed his 13.25 in × 10 in (33.7 cm × 25.4 cm) work using oil on a slate. The painting blends elements of both Neoclassicism and Romanticism. Franklin knew West, which influenced the creation of this painting.

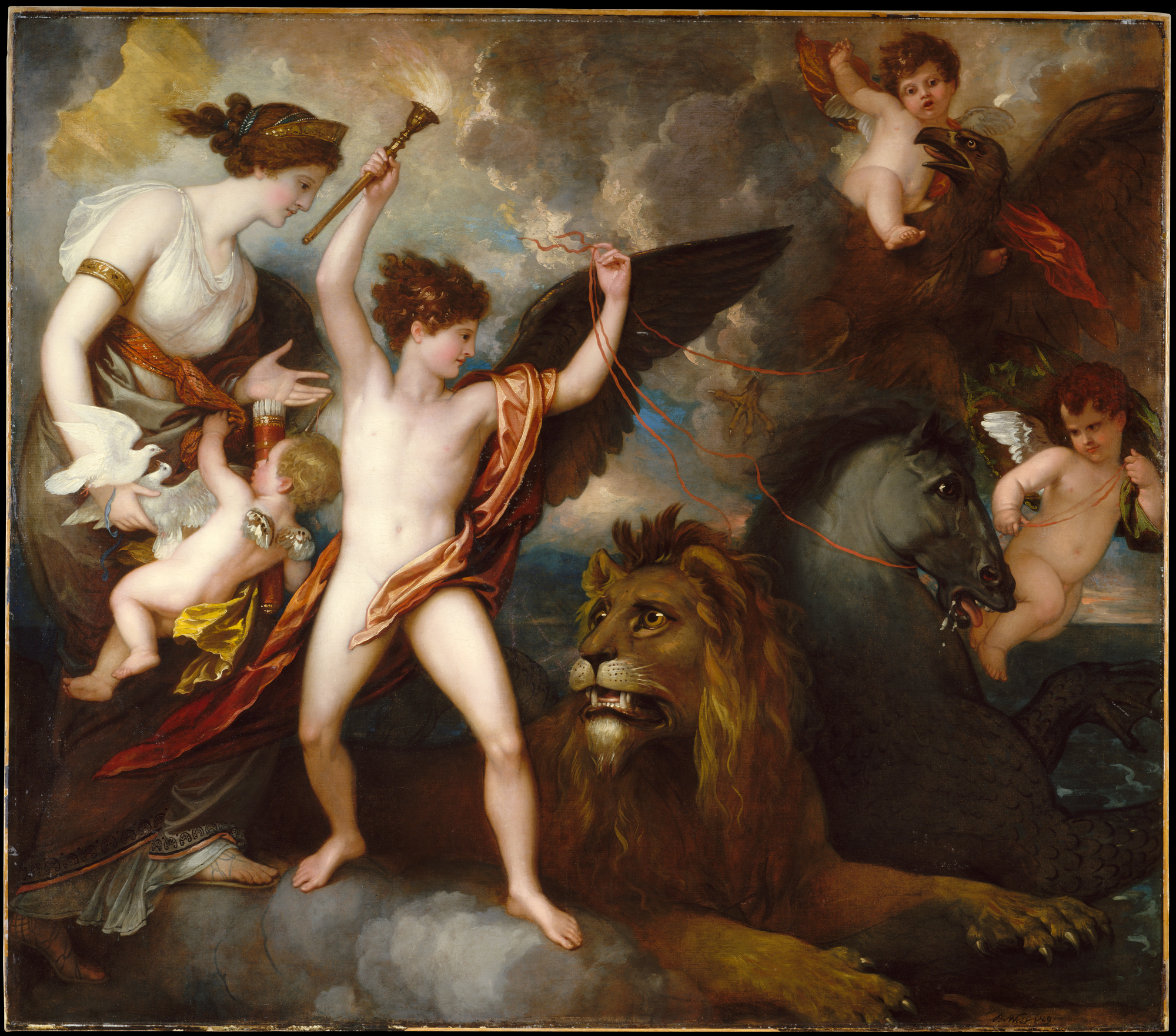
Omnia Vincit Amor, by Benjamin West, c. 1809, The Metropolitan Museum of Art

== Background ==
West based his painting on a well-known experiment Franklin conducted in 1752. Franklin observed that lightning frequently destroyed homes by igniting those made of wood. Franklin was determined to prove the presence of electricity in lightning through an experiment. Franklin's experiment, in its initial conception, depended on the completion of Christ Church in Philadelphia, whose steeples would be sufficiently high as to attract a lightning strike. Franklin then conceived of an alternative experiment that involved flying a kite during a thunderstorm with a metal key attached to the string.

Franklin conducted his experiment in private for several reasons, including its dangerous nature, and he did not want to disappoint the scientific community if the experiment failed. He decided to experiment alongside his son William in a field. Franklin demonstrated that the clouds carried an electrical charge by bringing a finger near the metal key, producing a spark. His experiments led to the widespread adoption of lightning rods on tall buildings to draw electricity off the building and into the ground.

== Description and interpretation ==
=== Painting ===
Franklin is pictured raising his hand into the stormy skies as the clouds open above him. A spark appears between the key and Franklin's hand. West depicts Franklin with white hair, as he is popularly remembered. He holds a scroll in his left hand and is wearing a red cloak that is blowing in the wind.

To Franklin's right is a group of cherubs assisting him in his experiment by holding the kite string and observing him. West dresses one of these cherubs in traditional Native American attire. Cherubs were traditionally used in Apotheosis paintings that deify humans. Directly to Franklin's right is another group of cherubs tinkering with a tool. Franklin's right arm, the Cherub to his right, and the Cherub to his left, come together to form a triangle, the compositional foundation of the entire painting. The arrangement directs the viewers' eyes to Franklin's hand and the lightning key. West amplifies this effect by clearly defining the edges of the key and making the surrounding electricity more pronounced than the lighting in the distance. Franklin's head and gaze are fixated upwards looking beyond the canvas towards the heavens. These elements suggest that Franklin calls on the forces on nature and the heavens in his experiment.

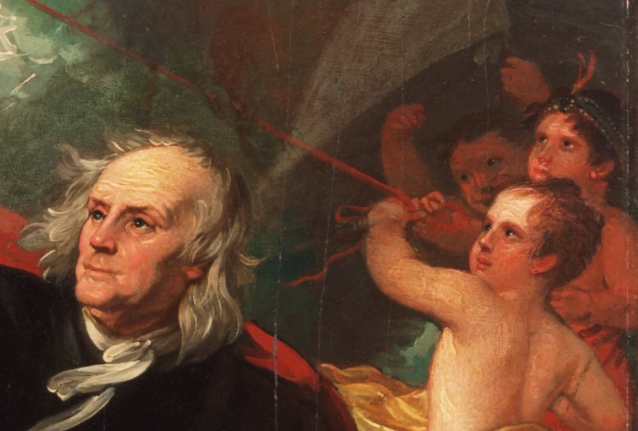
Detail of the cherub wearing Native American headdress

West includes elements commonly used in Romantic paintings, such as religious motifs and sublime aesthetics. However, the cherubs and themes of masculine heroism are more characteristic of Neoclassical paintings. The blend of two styles allows West to combine intelligibility with a sense of mystery.

=== Straying from the truth ===
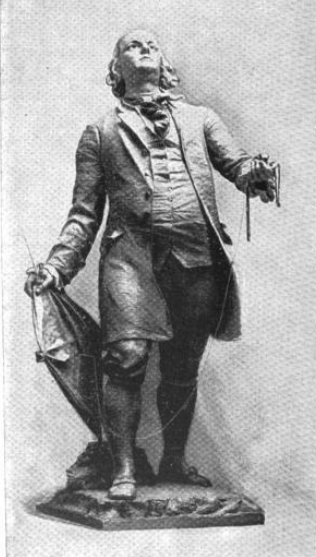
Statue of young Benjamin Franklin with kite - by Carl Rohl-Smith - 1893

The painting is an example of a history painting, but as West had done in the past with works such as in his 1770 The Death of General Wolfe, he strays from the truth and embellishes many elements for added dramatic effect. Franklin was in his forties and with his son when he conducted the experiment, but West paints him with white hair and wrinkly as an elderly man. West adds cherubs and other dramatic elements to depict Franklin as Prometheus-like figure, who stands as an American hero of scientific discovery. Other works of art, such as Carl Rohl-Smith's Statue of Young Benjamin Franklin with Kite, provide a more accurate representation of Franklin at the time of his experiment, giving him a significantly younger appearance.

=== West's relationship with Franklin ===
West and Franklin initially met in London, then developed an amicable relationship as fellow Philadelphians. West was born in Swarthmore, Pennsylvania, and Franklin moved to Pennsylvania in his early adulthood. They became close enough that West asked Franklin to be godfather to his second son. West decided to make the painting to celebrate the achievements of his friend after Franklin's death. The painting was intended to be a study for a much larger painting that West planned to donate in honor of his friend to the Philadelphia Hospital, established by Franklin.

== In modern culture ==
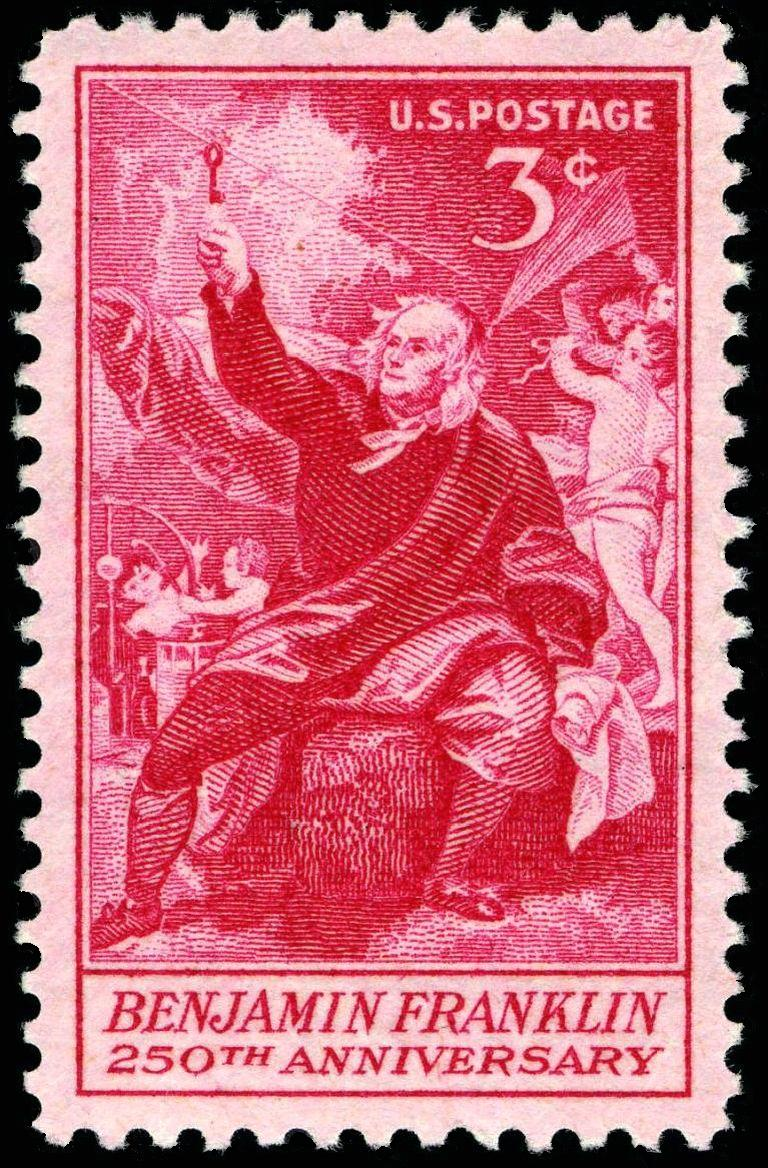
1956 Benjamin Franklin Drawing Electricity from the Sky stamp issued by the US government

In 1956 the United States selected this painting to be featured on their memorial postage stamp commemorating the 250 anniversary of Benjamin Franklin's birth.

== See also ==
- Franklin's electrostatic machine
- Lightning rod
