= Jacques de Romas =

French physicist (1713–1776)

Jacques de Romas (13 October 1713 – 21 January 1776) was a French physicist.

He held a judiciary office in the présidial of his lifelong hometown of Nérac. As a hobbyist, he was a polymath scientist until specialising in electricity.

He became known for physical experiments during thunderstorms and in 1750 proposed a connection between lightning and electricity when the chateau of Tampouy was hit by lightning strike. That same year, he invented a device with which he tried to measure atmospheric voltage. His colleague François de Vivens (1697–1780) of Clairac proposed to call the device a brontomètre (from Greek βρέμω: thunder). Also in 1750, Denis Barberet published about the supposed connection between lightning and electricity.

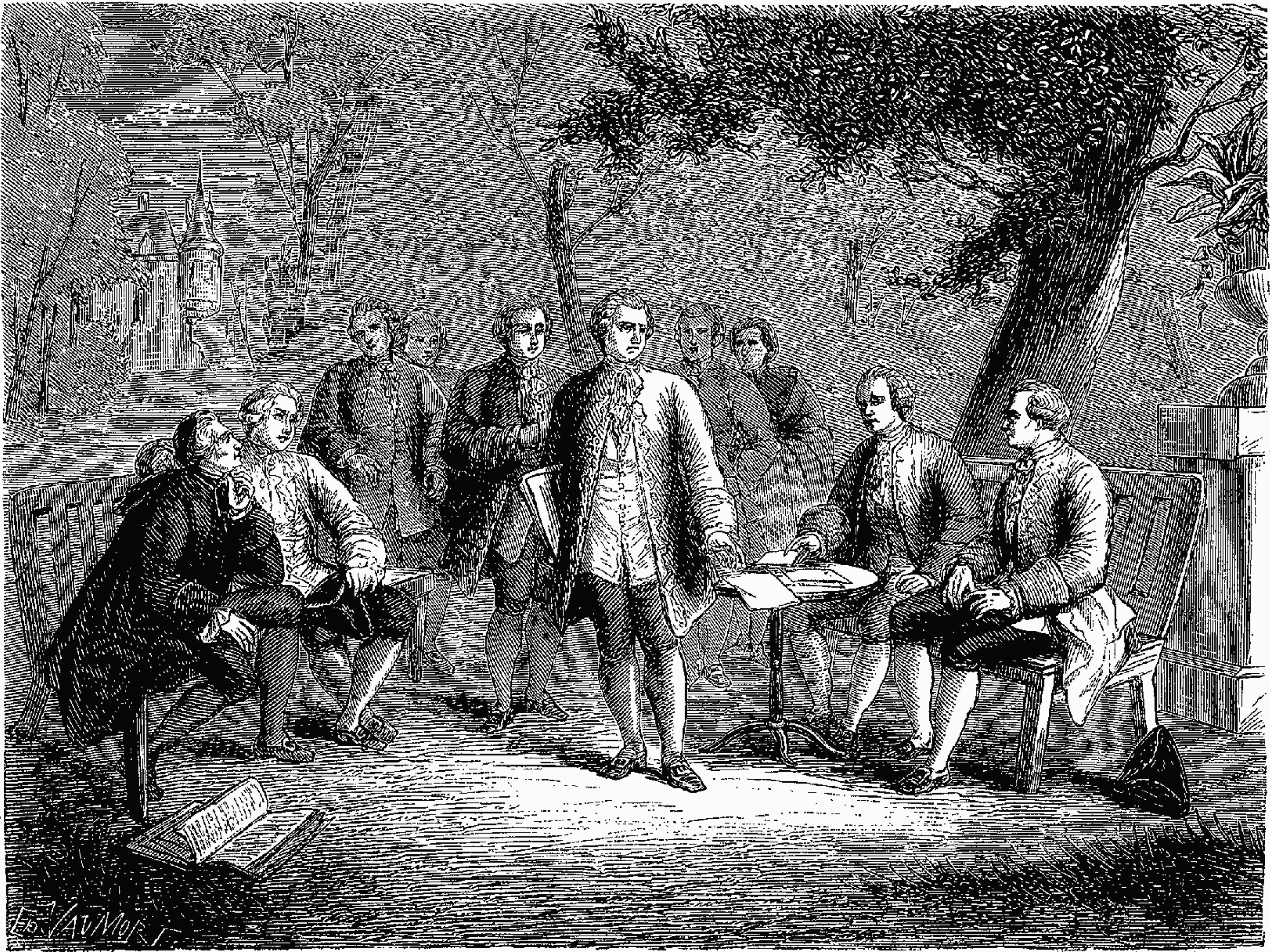
The scientific cénacle of the Château de Clairac; (from left to right) Montesquieu and the Baron de Secondat, his son, the Chevalier de Vivens, Romas and the Dutilh brothers.

The same decade, Romas conducted the kite experiment that Benjamin Franklin proposed in 1750 in a letter to Peter Collinson, but that had not yet reached France. Raising a wire-wrapped kite in a thunderstorm, Romas proved the electrical nature of lightning. During his experiment, he noticed ten feet long sparks and explosions. He also reported that during a repeat performance in front of a larger audience, he received severe jolts that were more intense than all he received before during experiments with Leyden jars. For this reason, he performed later experiments only with separately grounded conductors and kites that he handled via glass rods.

On 12 July 1752, he wrote a letter to the académie of Bordeaux with a first report about his experiences with a grounded rod during a lightning storm. On 14 May 1753, his first kite experiment is said to have taken place with locals as his only audience. Other reports tell of his first public experiments on 7 July 1753 on a road near Nérac. The particulars of his experiments were however often confused later, and the encyclopedia of Chassang simply states that his experiments took place „since 1757“. It is also reported that he installed lightning rods later in the 1750s in his home region.

Unlike many intellectuals of his era, the amateur physicist didn't travel much out of his home region. When he was made a member of the French Academy of Sciences in 1764 to honor his electrical kite experiments, he went to Paris. For that purpose, he had to prove that his experiments were conducted without knowledge of the similar breakthroughs of Franklin in the English colonies. The commission acknowledged this after studying his reports and letters to different fellow scientists.

In 1911, a 300 kg bronze statue in his honor was erected in Nérac, inaugurated by French president Armand Fallières. It was removed and smelted down in 1942 during the German occupation, but a replica was set up at the original site on 13 February 2010. A school and several streets in the region are named after Romas.
