= Caspar Wistar =

Caspar Wistar may refer to:

- Caspar Wistar (glassmaker) (1696–1752), Pennsylvania glassmaker and landowner
- Caspar Wistar (physician) (1761–1818), physician and anatomist, grandson of the glassmaker
