= Rheumatism =

Medical conditions affecting the joints or connective tissue

- Other names: Rheumatic disease
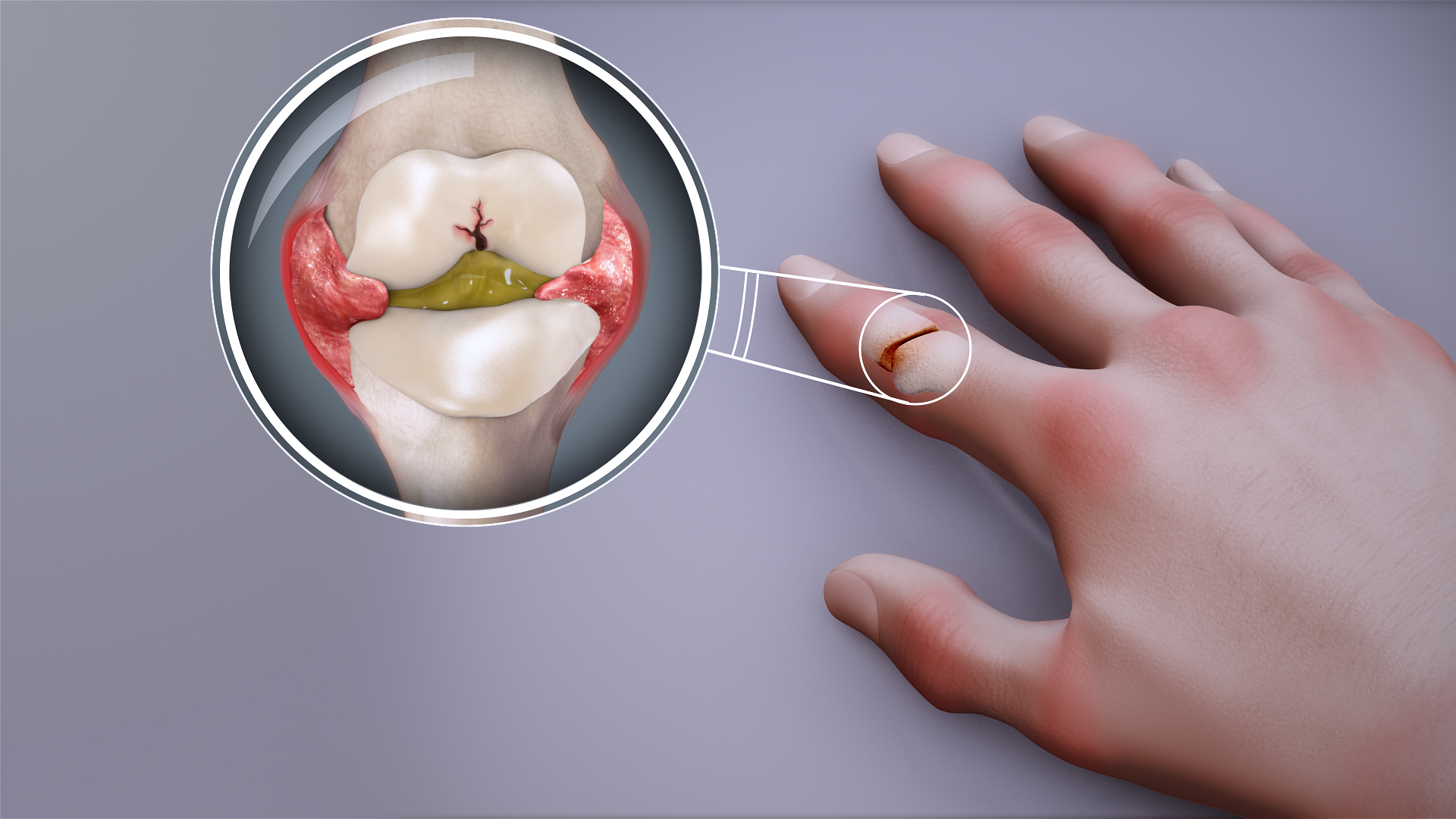
- Inflammation of synovial membrane of the finger joint in case of rheumatoid arthritis
- Specialty: Rheumatology
- Complications: Amplified musculoskeletal pain syndrome
- Treatment: None. Management of symptoms only.

Rheumatism /ˈruːmətɪzəm/ (from the Ancient Greek ῥεῦμα, rheûma) or rheumatic disorders are conditions causing chronic, often intermittent pain affecting the joints or connective tissue. Rheumatism does not designate any specific disorder, but covers at least 200 different conditions, including arthritis and "non-articular rheumatism", also known as "regional pain syndrome" or "soft tissue rheumatism". There is a close overlap between the term soft tissue disorder and rheumatism. Sometimes the term "soft tissue rheumatic disorders" is used to describe these conditions.

The term "Rheumatic Diseases" is used in MeSH to refer to connective tissue disorders. The branch of medicine devoted to the diagnosis and therapy of rheumatism is called rheumatology.

== Types ==
Many rheumatic disorders of chronic, intermittent pain (including joint pain, neck pain or back pain) have historically been caused by infectious diseases. Their etiology was unknown until the 20th century and not treatable. Postinfectious arthritis, also known as reactive arthritis, and rheumatic fever are other examples.

In the United States, major rheumatic disorders are divided into 10 major categories based on the nomenclature and classification proposed by the American College of Rheumatology (ACR) in 1983.

- Diffuse connective tissue diseases
  - Rheumatoid arthritis
  - Juvenile arthritis
  - Systemic lupus erythematosus
  - Sjögren syndrome
  - Scleroderma
  - Polymyositis
  - Dermatomyositis
  - Behçet's disease
  - Relapsing polychondritis
- Arthritis associated with spondylitis (i.e. spondarthritis)
  - Ankylosing spondylitis
  - Reactive arthritis
  - Psoriatic arthritis
- Osteoarthritis (i.e. osteoarthrosis, degenerative joint disease)
- Rheumatic syndromes associated with infectious agents (direct and indirect or reactive)
- Metabolic and endocrine diseases associated with rheumatic states
  - Gout, pseudogout
- Neoplasms
- Neurovascular disorders
- Bone and cartilage disorders
- Extraarticular disorders
  - Bursitis/Tendinitis of the shoulder, wrist, biceps, leg, knee cap (patella), ankle, hip, and Achilles tendon
  - Capsulitis
- Miscellaneous disorders associated with articular manifestations
  - Palindromic rheumatism is thought to be a form of rheumatoid arthritis.

== Diagnosis ==
Blood and urine tests will measure levels of creatinine and uric acid to determine kidney function, an elevation of the ESR and CRP is possible. After a purine-restricted diet, another urine test will help determine whether the body is producing too much uric acid or the body isn't excreting enough uric acid. Rheumatoid factor may be present, especially in the group that is likely to develop rheumatoid arthritis. A fine needle is used to draw fluid from a joint to determine if there is any build-up of fluid. The presence of uric acid crystals in the fluid would indicate gout. In many cases there may be no specific test, and it is often a case of eliminating other conditions before getting a correct diagnosis.

== Management ==
Initial therapy of the major rheumatological diseases is with analgesics, such as paracetamol and non-steroidal anti-inflammatory drugs (NSAIDs). Steroids, especially glucocorticoids, and stronger analgesics are often required for more severe cases.

== Terminology ==
The term rheumatism stems from the Late Latin rheumatismus, ultimately from Greek ῥευματίζομαι "to suffer from a flux", with rheum meaning bodily fluids, i.e., any discharge of blood or bodily fluid.

Before the 17th century, the joint pain which was thought to be caused by viscous humours seeping into the joints was always referred to as gout, a word adopted in Middle English from Old French gote "a drop; the gout, rheumatism".

The English term rheumatism in the current sense has been in use since the late 17th century, as it was believed that chronic joint pain was caused by excessive flow of rheum which means bodily fluids into a joint.

== See also ==
- Corbett's electrostatic machine
