= Kipping =

Kipping is a German surname. Notable people with the surname include:

- Brian Kipping (1953-2007), Canadian artist
- David Kipping (born 1983 or 1984), British-American astronomer
- Deon Kipping (born 1979), American gospel musician
- Eric Kipping, Canadian politician
- Frederic Stanley Kipping (1863−1949), English chemist
- Gordon Kipping, American architect
- Herwig Kipping (born 1948), German film director
- Johann Wolfgang Kipping (1695−1747), German jurist and professor
- Katja Kipping (born 1978), German politician
- Leonor Rivera-Kipping or Leonor Rivera (1867–1893, Jose Rizal's childhood love interest
- Norman Kipping (1901−1979), British industrialist

== See also ==
- Kipp
- Kipper
