= Corbett's electrostatic machine =

High voltage static electricity generating device that was made by Thomas Corbett

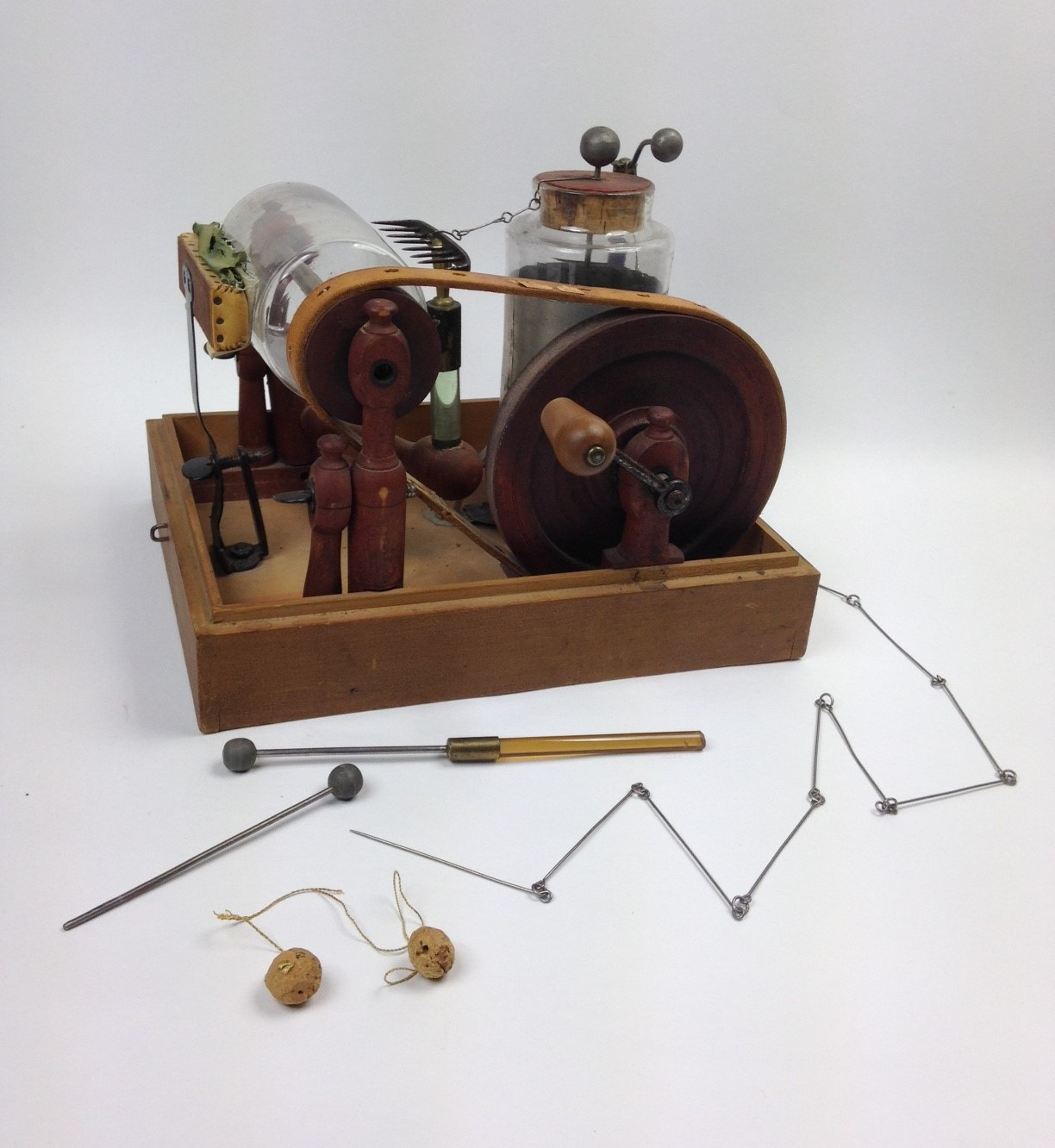
Corbett's electrostatic machine

Corbett's electrostatic machine is a static electricity generating device that was made by the Shaker physician Thomas Corbett in 1810. Intended to treat rheumatism, the device built up a static charge and stored it in a Leyden jar, an early type of capacitor.

== Description ==
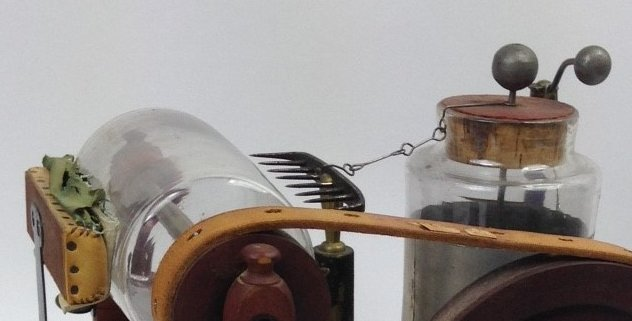
Close-up of metal rake + glass tumbler. Leyden jar is to the right.

Corbett was a medical physician for the Shakers, a religious group of colonial America. He was a botanist and preferred herbal medicines to bloodletting. His machine was hand-operated. Rotating a glass cylinder in contact with a silk pad caused a static charge to accumulate on the cylinder. A metal comb collected this charge, which was then stored in a Leyden jar. From the jar, the electrical charge could then be released into the patient, producing a shock akin to "touching a doorknob after walking across carpet in dry weather".

== See also ==
- Franklin's electrostatic machine
