= Deep Run (Alloway Creek tributary) =

Location
- Country: United States
- State: New Jersey
- County: Salem

Physical characteristics
- Source
  - location: Salem County, New Jersey, United States
  - coordinates: 39°32′6″N 75°18′20″W
- Mouth
  - location: Salem County, New Jersey, United States
  - coordinates: 39°33′44″N 75°22′33″W
  - elevation: 3 ft (0.91 m)

Deep Run (Earth)
Deep Run (the United States)
Deep Run (New Jersey)

Deep Run is a tributary of Alloway Creek in Salem County, New Jersey in the United States.
