= Herwig Kipping =

German film director and script writer (born 1948)

- Born: Herwig Kipping; 31 March 1948 (age 78); Meyhen, Naumburg, Saxony-Anhalt, Germany
- Occupations: Film director Script writer

Herwig Kipping (born 31 March 1948) is a German film director and script writer.

== Life ==
Herwig Kipping was born in Meyhen, a hamlet of fewer than 200 people located between Weimar and Leipzig, nearly 9 km south of Naumburg. At that time the area was part of the Soviet occupation zone. His father was a farmer and headed a local Agricultural Production Cooperative shortly after the boy was born.

By the time the young Kipping started attending school the German Democratic Republic had been formed. Kipping left school in 1964 and started apprenticeship as a pipe fitter at a VEB "Walter Ulbricht" Leuna chemical plant in southern Halle. However, before completing the course at the plant he returned to school to pass the final exams.

In 1967 he moved to the Humboldt University of Berlin where he started a five-year degree course in Mathematics. However, as he explained in an interview more than twenty years later, university life expanded his intellectual horizons: he became persuaded that he was better suited for Philosophy than Mathematics, and that the mathematics he was being taught was uninspiring and mechanistic. According to another more succinct source, he discovered that he was being prepared for a career in the Central Statistical Office. In any event, after progressing through slightly more than three years of the five year degree course he dropped out of the university.

"People in the west think they have found salvation because the state protects their property; [and because of this their connection with what makes life worth living] has long since been cut off"
"Der Westmensch glaubt sich im Besitz der Seligkeit, weil der Staat sein Eigentum schützt; [dabei habe er die Verbindung zu dem, was das Leben lebenswert macht] längst gekappt."

Herwig Kipping

During his time at the Humboldt Kipping developed an intense love for the works of philosopher-poets such as Georg Heym, Trakl, Rimbaud, Verlaine, Baudelaire, Dostoyevsky and, most particularly, Nietzsche. He also wrote his own poetry (which remained unpublished). Having left university at short notice, he now obtained work with the postal service in order to support himself, while still nurturing an ambition to become a philosopher-poet himself. Between 1972 and 1975 he performed his military service, serving in the People's Army as a radio operator stationed at Fünfeichen (Neubrandenburg) in the north-east of the country. On completing his military service, in 1977 he volunteered for an internship with Deutscher Fernsehfunk (DFF), the national television service. During his internship period he worked as a production assistant for Thomas Langhoff. The next year, by now aged 30, he applied successfully for a study place at the Film and Television Academy in Potsdam-Babelsberg. This time he completed the five year degree course, receiving his degree in 1982. His graduation film, "Hommage a Hölderlin" (1983) was well received, although an earlier film he had put together during his second year about the postal service, and entitled "Bahnpostfahrer" (1979), caused a sensation at an initial screening in Leipzig, but was then suppressed for nine months, earning him a reputation with the authorities as a trouble maker at a time when the rise of the "Solidarity" movement in neighbouring Poland was making the East German authorities nervous about any hint of sub-optimal worker contentment at home. Later he told an interviewer that the university had wanted to "get rid of" him following the adverse reaction of the ruling SED (party) to "Bahnpostfahrer" He remained at the university, but it was now that he also took the precaution of joining the country's ruling Socialist Unity Party of Germany (SED / Sozialistische Einheitspartei Deutschlands), still a believer in the party's stated ideals, while painfully aware of the restrictions imposed on personal freedom by the practical realities of the one-party dictatorship.

Following graduation he returned to work with Deutscher Fernsehfunk, initially with a journalistic brief. He provided the reportage for a television programme on Karl Stülpner. The next year he produced a short documentary film with the title "Sechs auf dem Dach" (1984) about a team of roofers. However, this was modified before release, and Kipping became involved in a furious dispute about the changes made to it. The disagreement escalated, as Kipping launched a general criticism of the broadcaster's "information policy". He was given a demotion on account of his "antisocial activities on a platform of opposition" and responded by resigning from the Deutscher Fernsehfunk. In the end he was also thrown out of the country's ruling SED (party).

Between 1984 and 1989 Kipping worked as a free-lance script-writer. He regularly submitted scripts to DEFA, the state-owned film company, but none of his scripts was accepted. It was also during this period, in 1986, that he studied with Heiner Carow at the National Arts Academy. Everything changed in November 1989 when the Berlin Wall was breached by protestors and it became apparent that the fraternal Soviet forces had received no orders to suppress protest, nor to restrain people crossing the hitherto lethal border dividing Berlin. This opened the way to an end for one party dictatorship and indeed, within a year, German reunification. A few years later Kipping would describe himself as a child of "Die Wende" (the changes triggered in November 1989), while insisting that the many people who encountered the "experience of no longer being needed" when the German Democratic Republic collapsed also deserved sympathy. It was something he himself knew, in a different context, from the years when his film scripts were routinely rejected by the only film company in town.

After 1989 Kipping experienced the freedoms and the disappointments of a career in the newly reunified Germany. DEFA now accepted his film scripts, the first of which, "Das Land hinter dem Regenbogen", was screened in 1991. He had been working on it since 1986 and the film was well received. Set in a fictional East German town called "Stalina" in the critical year 1953, the allegorical film deals with a girl called Marie who dreams of another world, beyond the rainbow. Her grandfather at this time speaks to his iconic bust of Stalin and confidently expects the creation of paradise in their hometown. Dreams turn sour and the arrival of Soviet soldiers triggers a cruel dénoument. His next film, Novalis: The Blue Flower, appeared in 1993. However, in 1992 the old DEFA studios were sold, and an inability to attract further funding proved as effective a block on Kipping's film directing career as the bureaucratic obstruction he had faced in the 1980s.
