= Kite experiment =

Science experiment on lightning and electricity

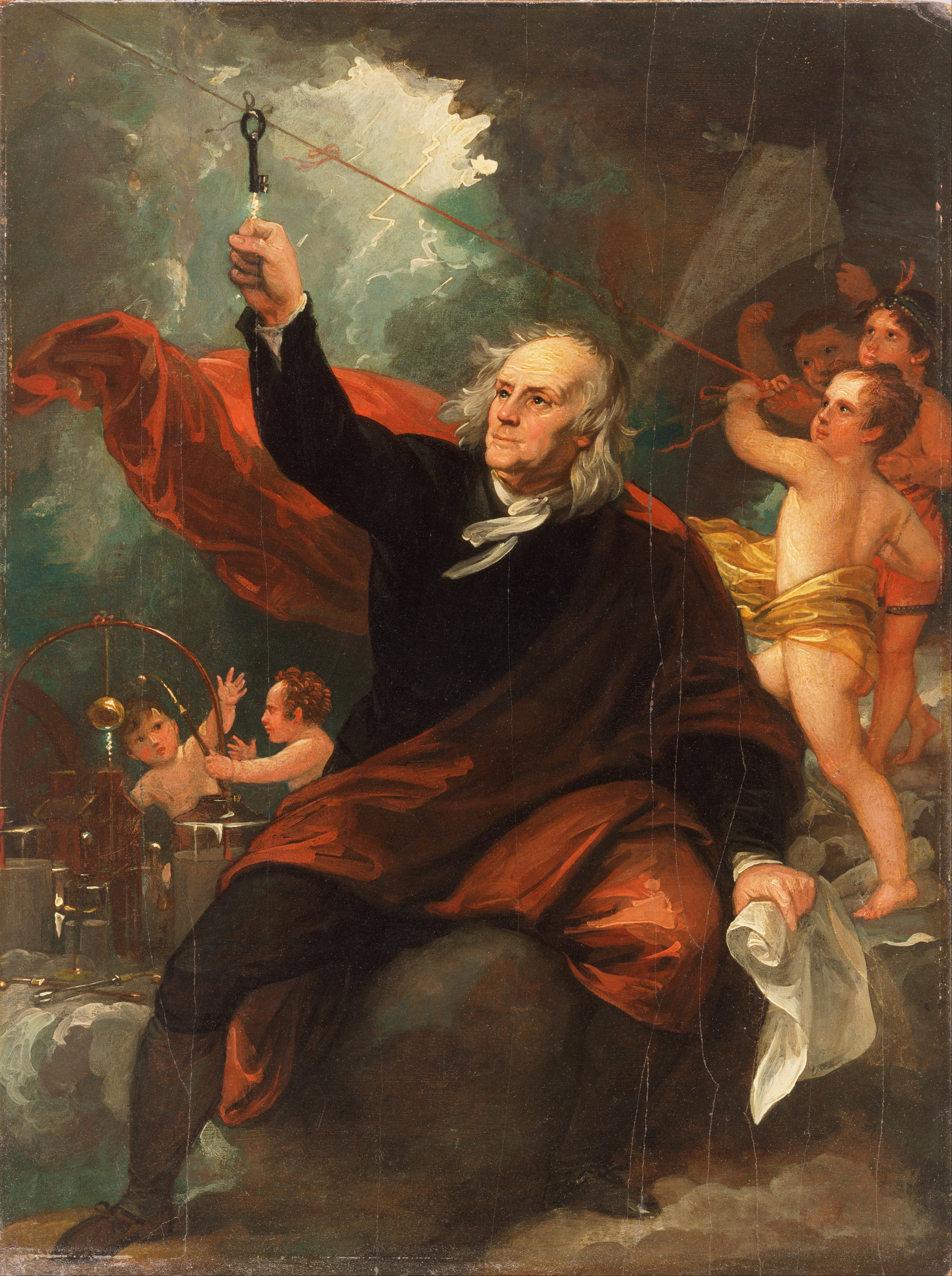
Benjamin Franklin Drawing Electricity from the Sky, an artistic rendition of Franklin's kite experiment painted by Benjamin West, c. 1816

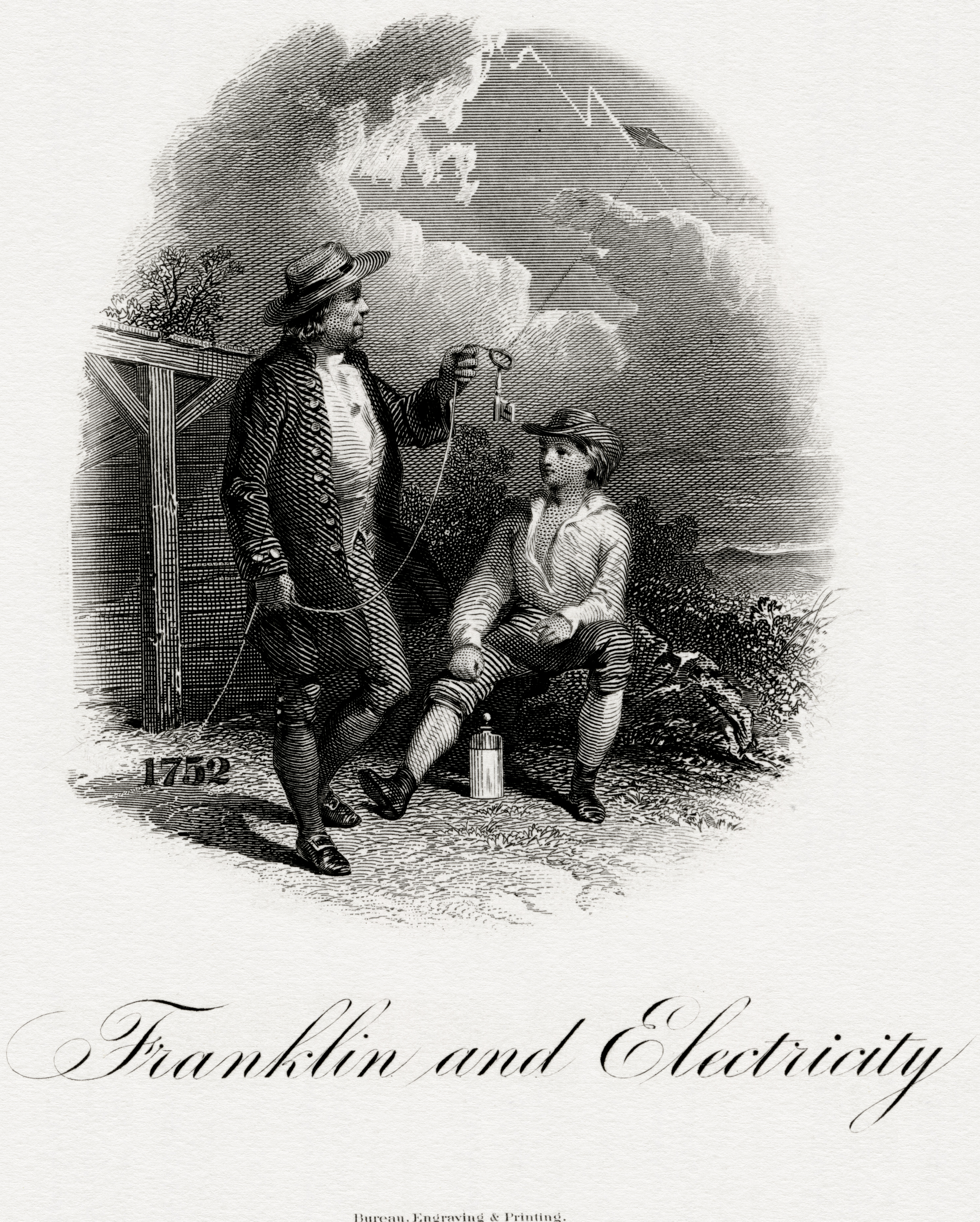
The BEP engraved the vignette Franklin and Electricity (c. 1860) which was used on the $10 National Bank Note from the 1860s to 1890s.

The kite experiment is a scientific experiment in which a kite with a pointed conductive wire attached to its apex is flown near thunder clouds to collect static electricity from the air and conduct it down the wet kite string to the ground. The experiment was first proposed in 1752 by Benjamin Franklin, who reportedly conducted the experiment with the assistance of his son William. The experiment's purpose was to investigate the nature of lightning and electricity, which were not yet understood. Combined with further experiments on the ground, the kite experiment demonstrated that lightning and electricity were the result of the same phenomenon.

== Background ==
Speculations of Jean-Antoine Nollet had led to the issue of the electrical nature of lightning being posed as a prize question at Bordeaux in 1749. In 1750, it was the subject of public discussion in France with a dissertation of Denis Barberet receiving a prize in Bordeaux. Barberet proposed a cause in line with the triboelectric effect. The same year, Franklin reversed his previous skepticism of electrical lightning's attraction to high points. The physicist Jacques de Romas also wrote a mémoire with similar ideas that year and later defended them as independent of Franklin's.

== Lightning rod experiments ==
In 1752, Franklin proposed an experiment with conductive rods to attract lightning to a Leyden jar, an early form of capacitor, but there was no spire in Philadelphia that was high enough for him to attempt it. Thomas-François Dalibard, however, did carry out such an experiment in Northern France in May 1752 at Marly-la-Ville. Then the following years, an attempt to replicate the experiment killed Georg Wilhelm Richmann in Saint Petersburg in August 1753; he was thought to be the victim of ball lightning.

== Franklin's kite experiment ==
Franklin conceived the idea of using a kite to raise the lightning rod to a great height. He described the kite experiment in a letter to the Pennsylvania Gazette published on October 19, 1752. In that letter, Franklin did not specify the circumstances in which he had carried out the experiment himself. Franklin's letter was read before the Royal Society on December 21 and later printed in the Philosophical Transactions.

The fullest account of Franklin's actual experiment was given by Joseph Priestley in his 1767 treatise on The History and Present State of Electricity. Priestley presumably learned the details from Franklin himself, who was in London at the time that Priestley was composing that book. According to Priestley, Franklin's experiment took place in June 1752, when he flew a kite during a thunderstorm with the assistance of his son William Franklin. The kite was attached to a hemp string, at the other end of which Franklin tied a metallic house key that he had borrowed from Benjamin Loxley. That key was also tied to a silk cord, which acted as an insulator and allowed the Franklins to control the kite without touching the key or the conducting string of wet hemp. In order to keep the silk and the key dry, they sheltered from the rain in an open shed.

Contrary to popular belief, Franklin's kite was not struck by lightning, which would probably have resulted in serious injury or death. Instead, an electrical charge was induced on the kite by its proximity to an oppositely charged storm cloud. Franklin noticed that loose threads of the string were repelling one another and inferred that it had become electrically charged and that he could transfer some of the charge to a Leyden jar by touching it to the key. He also approached his hand to the key, which resulted in an electrical spark. These results proved the electrical nature of lightning.
