= Remission (medicine) =

Reduction or disappearance of a disease's signs and symptoms

Remission is either the reduction or disappearance of the signs and symptoms of a disease. The term may also be used to refer to the period during which this reduction occurs. A remission may be considered a partial remission or a complete remission. Each disease, type of disorder, or clinical trial can have its own definition of a partial remission. For example, a partial remission for cancer may be defined as a 50% or greater reduction in the measurable parameters of tumor growth as may be found on physical examination, radiologic study, or by biomarker levels from a blood or urine test.

A complete remission, also called a full remission, is a total disappearance of the signs and symptoms of a disease. A person whose condition is in complete remission may be considered cured or recovered. Relapse is a term to describe returning symptoms of the disease after a period of remission. In cancer-treatment, doctors usually avoid the term "cured" and instead prefer the term "no evidence of disease" (NED) to refer to a complete remission of cancer, which does not rule out the possibility of relapse.

In mental disorders, there is generally no distinction between partial remission and complete remission. For example, a person diagnosed with a personality disorder must initially fit a set or subset of criteria from a predefined list, and remission in this context is defined as no longer meeting the criteria required for diagnosis. In this case it is still possible for the person to be demonstrating some symptoms, but they are at a subclinical severity or frequency that does not merit re-diagnosis.

For some diseases featuring remission, especially for those with no known cure such as multiple sclerosis, remission is implied to always be partial.

== See also ==
- Relapsing–remitting
- Spontaneous remission
