= Palindromic rheumatism =

Recurrent inflammatory attacks of the joints

- Specialty: Rheumatology

Palindromic rheumatism (PR) is a syndrome characterised by recurrent, self-resolving inflammatory attacks in and around the joints (rheumatism), and consists of arthritis or periarticular soft tissue inflammation. The course is often acute onset, with sudden and rapidly developing attacks or flares. There is pain, redness, swelling, and disability of one or multiple joints. The interval between recurrent palindromic attacks and the length of an attack is extremely variable from few hours to days. Attacks may become more frequent with time but there is no joint damage after attacks. It is thought to be an autoimmune disease, possibly an abortive form of rheumatoid arthritis.

== Presentation ==
The exact prevalence of palindromic rheumatism in the general population is unknown, and this condition is often considered a rare disease by non-rheumatologists. However, a recent Canadian study showed that the incidence of PR in a cohort of incident arthritis was one case of PR for every 1.8 cases of rheumatoid arthritis (RA). The incidence of PR is less than that of RA but is not as rare as previously thought.

Palindromic rheumatism is a syndrome presented with inflammatory para-arthritis (soft tissue rheumatism) and inflammatory arthritis both of which cause sudden inflammation in one or several joints or soft tissue around joints. The flares usually present with mono- or oligo-articular involvement, which have onset over hours and last a few hours to a few days, and then go away completely. However episodes of recurrence form a pattern, with symptom-free periods between attacks lasting for weeks to months. The most commonly involved joints were knees, metacarpophalangeals and proximal interphalangeal joints of the hands or feet. Constitutionally, there may or may not be a fever and swelling of the joints. The soft tissues are involved with swelling of the periarticular tissues, especially heel pads and finger pads. Nodules may be found in the subcutaneous tissues. The frequency of attacks may be variable over the course but there is no joint damage after attacks.

It typically affects people between the ages of 20 and 50. One study showed an average age of onset of 49.

A population cohort study in Taiwan suggested that patients with PR had an increased risk of developing rheumatoid arthritis, systemic lupus erythematosus, Sjogren's syndrome, systemic sclerosis, and polymyositis.

== Causes ==
Palindromic rheumatism is a disease of unknown cause. It has been suggested that it is an abortive form of rheumatoid arthritis (RA), since anti-cyclic citrullinated peptide antibodies (anti-CCP) and antikeratin antibodies (AKA) are present in a high proportion of patients, as is the case in rheumatoid arthritis. Unlike RA and some other forms of arthritis, palindromic rheumatism affects men and women equally. Palindromic rheumatism is frequently the presentation for Whipple disease which is caused by the infectious agent Tropheryma whipplei (formerly T. whippelii).

== Diagnosis ==
Due to the symptoms of palindromic arthritis and the nature of the attacks, diagnosis can be difficult or take a long time. The symptoms can be similar to many other forms of arthritis or other autoimmune diseases. It is often a case of eliminating the other conditions before getting the correct diagnosis due to there being no specific test for PR diagnosis.

No single test can confirm a diagnosis. A doctor may make a diagnosis based on medical history and signs and symptoms. Palindromic rheumatism must be distinguished from acute gouty arthritis and an atypical, acute onset of rheumatoid arthritis (RA). Without specific tests (such as analysis of joint fluid), it may be difficult to distinguish palindromic rheumatism from other episodic joint problems. A person may experience more than one autoimmune disorder at the same time, as overlap syndrome. Laboratory findings are usually normal. Blood tests may show an elevation of the ESR and CRP, but are otherwise unremarkable. Rheumatoid factor may be present especially in the group that is likely to develop rheumatoid arthritis.

Proposed classification by Guerne and Weismann in 1992:

- A 6-month history of brief sudden-onset and recurrent episodes of monoarthritis or rarely polyarthritis or of soft tissue inflammation.
- Direct observation of one attack by a physician.
- Three or more joints involved in different attacks.
- No radiologic evidence of bone or joint erosion.
- Exclusion of other arthritides, such as rheumatoid arthritis (RA), systemic lupus erythematosus (SLE), or gout

== Management ==
Treatment may include nonsteroidal anti-inflammatory drugs (NSAIDs) for acute attacks. Antimalarials, such as hydroxychloroquine, have been helpful in reducing the frequency and duration of attacks and may reduce the likelihood that palindromic rheumatism will progress to rheumatoid arthritis.

== Etymology ==
Palindromic rheumatism derives its name from the Greek palindromos meaning to take the same road once again (palin, again + dromos, pathway) emphasizing how the illness begins and ends in a similar way. The term "palindrome" means a word that is spelled the same forward as backward (examples include "kayak" and "mum").
