= Alloway Creek =

River in New Jersey, United States

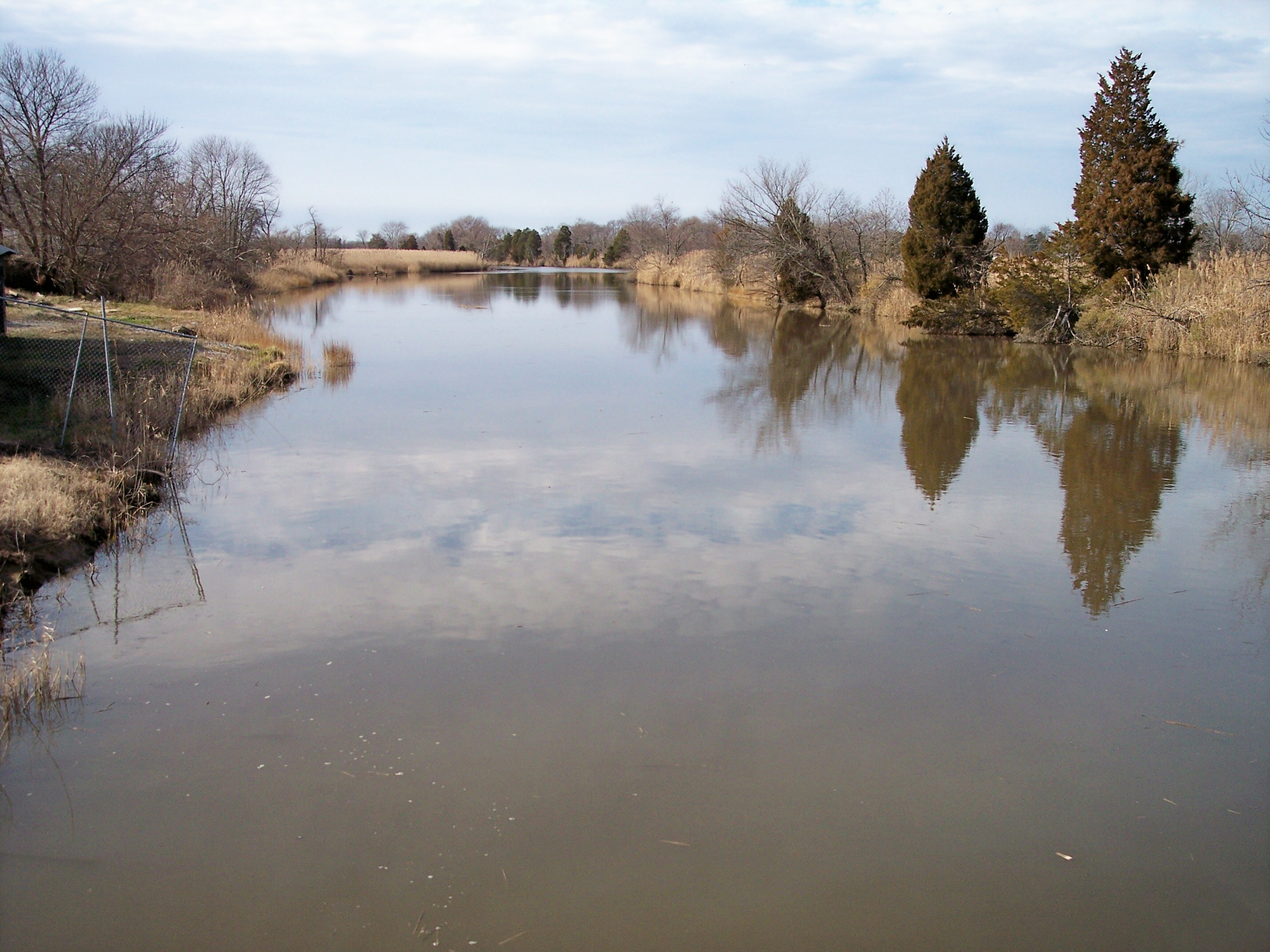
Alloway Creek in Quinton Township in 2006

Alloway Creek is a 23.2-mile-long (37.3 km) tributary of the Delaware River in Salem County, New Jersey in the United States. The name is a derivative of Allowas, an Indian chief. It has also been known by other names: Aloes River, Aloes Creek, Cotton River, Korten River, Short River, Monmouth River, Munmouth River, and Roiter's River.

The headwaters of the creek are to the southeast of Daretown, in Upper Pittsgrove Township. It flows roughly parallel and to the south of Commissioners Pike, meeting Cool Run before turning west and flowing under the pike. Entering a marshy area, it meets an unnamed tributary and flows under Alloway Road. Here the creek enters Alloway Lake, formed by a dam at the town of Alloway and the largest lake in Salem County. Cedar Brook also feeds the lake, entering from the south.

Below the dam at Alloway, the creek becomes a tidal marsh and meadow estuary. About a mile west of the dam, Deep Run enters from the south. The meanders of the creek become pronounced as the creek turns to flow southwest towards Quinton, where it receives the outlet of Laurel Lake, the water supply for Salem. Route 49 crosses the creek at Quinton. Below Hancock's Bridge, the creek enters the marshes fringing the Delaware. A network of estuarine channels known as Abbotts Meadow lies on the north side. On the south side, a channel has been cut across a meander; Alloway Hope Halfway, a tidal channel connecting with Hope Creek, enters the south side of the meander loop there. The island in the middle of the loop and the land on the south bank from the meander to the mouth are part of Mad Horse Creek Wildlife Management Area.

The Alloway Creek watershed is 75 square miles (190 km^{2}), accounting for about 20% of Salem County land area, and providing a habitat essential for commercial and sport fishing, hunting and trapping.

A volunteer organization called Delaware Riverkeeper has a monitoring site at the Route 49 bridge in Quinton. As of 1995, Riverkeepers regularly tested the surface water and recorded stream conditions. The goal of Riverkeeper is to ensure that the Delaware River and every tributary stream of the watershed is actively protected by local residents.

== See also ==
- List of rivers of New Jersey
