= Denis Barberet =

French biologist and veterinarian

Denis Barberet (1714–1770) was a French biologist and veterinarian.

He was born in the wine-growing region of Bourgogne which was then in the Province of Burgundy. He became a physician at the Faculty of Montpellier and travelled to Italy. In 1743 he established a medical practice at Dijon and then at Bourg-en-Bresse, before practising medicine from 1766 at Toulon and in the military as a doctor in the French Navy. He became known for his scientific memoirs recognized by various learned societies. He compiled comprehensive bibliographies of scientific memoirs and documents.
