= John Canton =

British physicist (1718–1772)

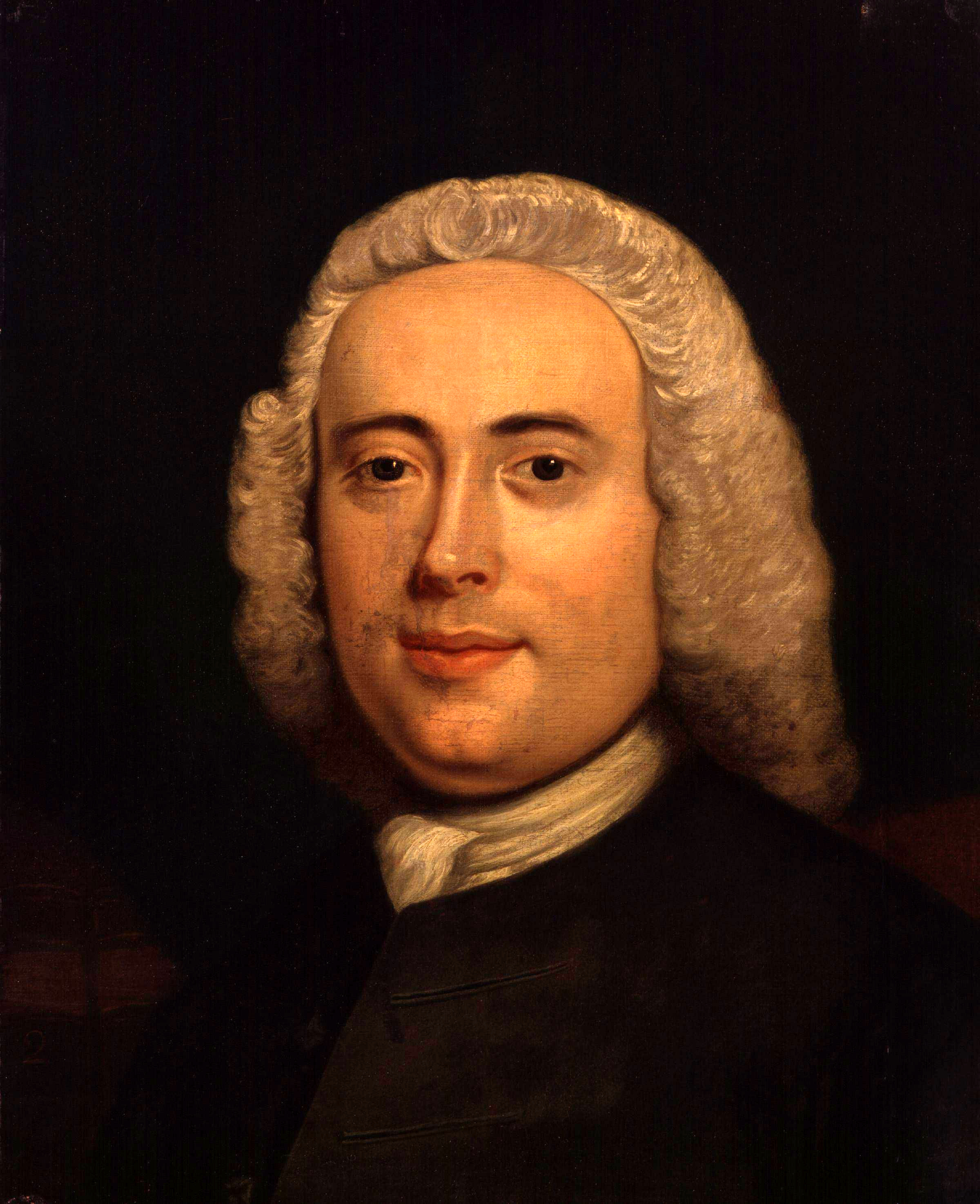
- 1740–1749 portrait
- Born: 31 July 1718; Stroud, Gloucestershire, England
- Died: 22 March 1772 (aged 53); London, England
- Citizenship: British
- Known for: Electrostatic induction Pith-ball electroscope Artificial magnets Compressibility of liquids Canton’s phosphorus
- Awards: Copley Medal (1751), (1764)
- Scientific career
- Fields: Physics

John Canton FRS (31 July 1718 – 22 March 1772) was a British physicist. He was born in Middle Street Stroud, Gloucestershire, to a weaver, John Canton (b. 1687) and Esther (née Davis). As a schoolboy, he became the first person to determine the latitude of Stroud, while making a sundial. The sundial caught the attention of many, including Dr Henry Miles, a Stroud-born Fellow of the Royal Society. Miles encouraged Canton to leave Gloucestershire to become a trainee teacher for Samuel Watkins, the headmaster of a Nonconformist school in Spital Square, London, with whom he ultimately entered into partnership.

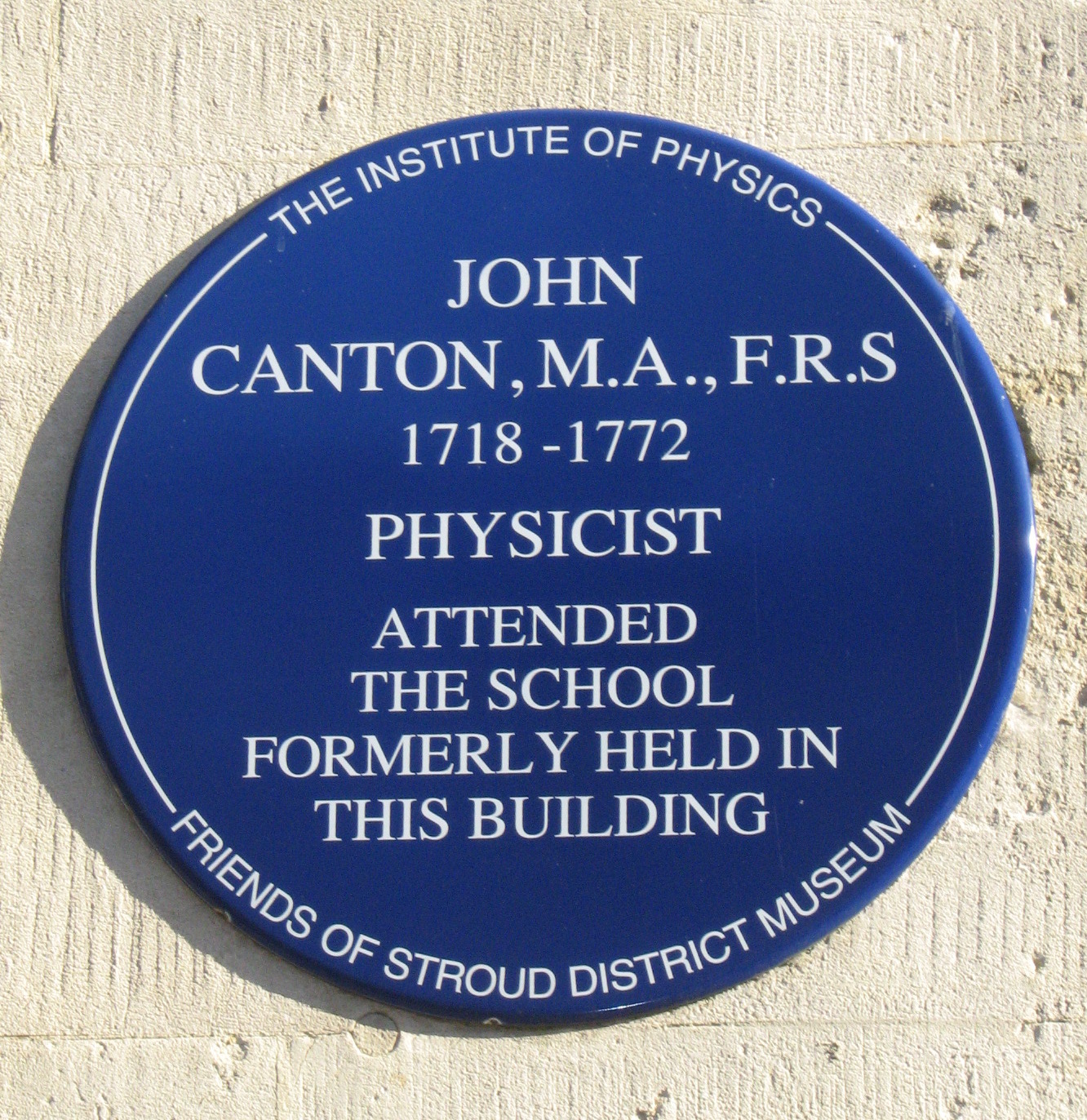
Plaque to John Canton on the wall of the Old Town Hall in the Shambles, Stroud, Gloucestershire

In 1750, he read a paper before the Royal Society on a method of making artificial magnets, and was subsequently elected a Fellow of the society (FRS). In 1751 he was a recipient of the Copley Medal "On account of his communicating to the Society, and exhibiting before them, his curious method of making Artificial Magnets without the use of Natural ones." He was the first in England to verify Benjamin Franklin's hypothesis of the identity of lightning and electricity, and he made several important electrical discoveries.

In 1762 and 1764, he published experiments in refutation of the decision of the Florentine Academy, at that time generally accepted, that water is incompressible. He put a hollow glass sphere with a thin capillary tube on it, and filled the sphere with water. He put the entire thing under an air pump, and changed the pressure between 2 atm and a near vacuum. He observed that the water rose up the capillary when in a near vacuum, and vice versa. He thus concluded that an increase of 1 atm would compress water by 1/10870 in volume. This agrees with modern value for the bulk modulus of water to within 3%. He also studied the compressibility of spirit of wine, olive oil, mercury and seawater, etc., and found that the compressibility increased with a decrease in density.

In 1768, he described the preparation, by calcining oyster-shell with sulphur, of the phosphorescent material known as Canton's phosphorus. His investigations were carried on while he worked as a school teacher. He died in London aged 53 of dropsy.

He read to the Royal Society letters from Thomas Bayes that formed the foundation for modern day Bayes' Theorem. These were later published by the Royal Society. John Canton did not receive the letters directly from Bayes, but through an intermediary, Richard Price, who edited Bayes' manuscripts before sending them to John Canton.

Canton is now mainly remembered for his work in electrostatics, particularly the invention of the pith ball electroscope, and his studies in atmospheric electricity. He is honoured with a blue plaque at the site of his old school in his hometown of Stroud.
