= Caspar Wistar (glassmaker) =

American glassmaker (1696–1752)

Caspar Wistar (born Caspar Wüster) (February 3, 1696 – March 21, 1752) was a Holy Roman Empire-born glassmaker and landowner in Pennsylvania.

One of the first German colonists in Pennsylvania, he became a leader of that community and prospered in land transactions. He “arrived in Philadelphia in 1717 with nearly no money; at the time of his death in 1752, his wealth outstripped that of the contemporary elite more than threefold...an immigrant’s path to achieving the American Dream."

== Family ==
He was the father of Richard Wistar, Sr. (1727–1781), glassmaker and landowner in Pennsylvania and the grandfather of Caspar Wistar (1761–1818), the physician and anatomist after whom the genus Wisteria is named. Another child, Rebecca Wistar, married Samuel Morris.

His brother, John (born Johannes Wüster) (1708–1789) emigrated to Philadelphia in 1727 and settled in the Germantown district. John was registered under a variant of the surname, "Wister". To this day, there exist two spellings of the family name. While Caspar anglicized his name to "Wistar", John spelled his "Wister". The two each founded prominent Philadelphia-area families, and the difference in spelling persisted.

== Biography ==
Caspar Wistar, the son of forester Hans Caspar Wüster and Anna Catharina Wüster, spent his first 21 years in Waldhilsbach, a village in the Palatinate near Heidelberg under the reign of prince Johann Wilhelm, Elector Palatine (1658–1716). According to family tradition, he was born in the village forester's house. He grew up during the tumultuous Nine Years' War (1688–1697) and the War of the Spanish Succession (1702–1713), which caused hardships and instability for the people of the Palatinate due to invasions by the French and British.

Wistar served as a forester's apprentice, but government reforms (particularly pay cuts for foresters) limited his professional opportunities, so he decided to emigrate to the United States. He left the Palatinate in 1717, forgoing his father's hereditary title and position to seek out a new life across the Atlantic Ocean.

He arrived in Pennsylvania in 1717 (according to his memoir, with only nine pennies to his name). Upon his arrival, he was registered under the surname "Wistar". He worked in various manual trades, including soapmaking and the manufacture of brass buttons.

He became a British subject in 1724 and joined the Religious Society of Friends (the Quakers) in 1726. He married Catherine Jansen (or Johnson) on May 25, 1725; they had seven children.

== Glassworks ==
In 1739, Wistar established a furnace in southern New Jersey and began manufacturing window panes, bottles, and chemical apparatuses. After his death, the glassworks was run by his son Richard until 1781.
