= Early glassmaking in the United States =

Glassmaking in the United States before the 18th century

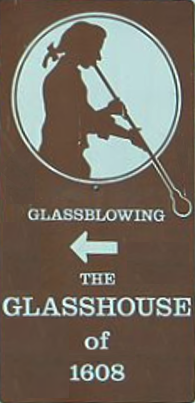
Jamestown

Early glassmaking in the United States began in Colonial America in 1608 at the Colony of Virginia near Jamestown, believed to be the first industrial facility in what would later become the United States. For centuries, glassmaking procedures, techniques, and recipes were kept secret, with countries actively preventing glassmaking knowledge from spreading beyond their borders. German workers with glassmaking knowledge, described as Dutchmen, along with Polish glass workers, were brought to Colonial America to begin operations. Although glass was made at Jamestown, production was soon suspended because of strife in the colony. A second attempt at Jamestown also failed.

Later attempts to produce glass were made during the 1600s; glass works in New Amsterdam and the Colony of Massachusetts Bay had some success. In the 17th century, at least two New Amsterdam glass factories may have conducted small-scale operations for several decades, while glass production at the Massachusetts glass works was short-lived. 17th and 18th century glass works were usually built near water for transportation and in proximity to wooded areas for fuel. Glassmaking increased in the 18th century, but by 1800 there were only about ten factories producing glass in the United States. Major obstacles to glassmaking in the United States were competition from imports, finding labor with glassmaking knowledge, and the difficulty of finding raw materials necessary to make the glass.

== Glassmaking ==
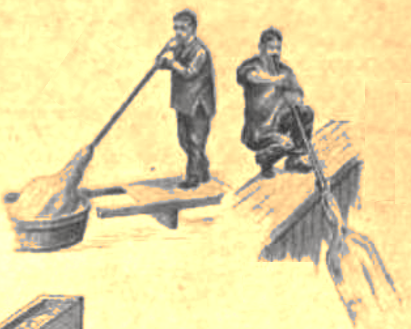
Glassblower creating a hollow cylinder as the first step for window glass

Glass is made by starting with a batch of ingredients, melting it together, forming the glass product, and gradually cooling it. The batch is dominated by sand, which contains silica. Smaller quantities of other ingredients, such as soda and limestone, are also added to the batch. The batch is placed inside a pot or tank that is heated by a furnace to roughly 3,090 °F (1,700 °C). (Note: An older source states that the batch melting temperature is 2,600 °F (1,430 °C). Another older source quotes a glass works spokesman as saying the furnace is heated to between 2,800 °F (1,540 °C) and 3,600 °F (1,980 °C).) Glassmakers use the term "metal" to describe batch that has been melted together. At Jamestown, sand from the James River was used for its silica, and the plentiful woods nearby provided fuel for furnaces.

The melted batch, or metal, is typically shaped into the glass product (other than plate and window glass) by either glassblowing or pressing it into a mold. Glass was not pressed in the United States until the 1820s. Until the 20th century, window glass production involved blowing a cylinder and flattening it. Two major methods to make window glass, the crown method and the cylinder method, were used until the process was changed much later in the 1920s. All glass products must then be cooled gradually (annealed), or else they could easily break. Annealing was originally conducted in the United States using a kiln that was sealed with the fresh glass inside, heated, and gradually cooled. During the 1860s, annealing kilns were replaced with a conveyer oven, called a lehr, that was less labor intensive. Until the 1760s, most glass produced in Colonial America was "green" glass, which has a greenish color and does not contain any additives to remove the greenish tint or add a more pleasing color.

One major expense for glass factories is fuel for the furnace, and this often determined the location of the glass works. Glassmakers originally used wood for fuel in Colonial America. Coal first began being used in the 1770s. Alternative fuels such as natural gas and oil were not used in the United States until 1875. Labor and transportation are also important aspects of glassmaking. Glassmaking methods and recipes were kept secret, and most European countries forbid immigration to the United States by glassworkers. Some skilled glassworkers were smuggled from Europe to the United States. Waterways provided transportation networks before the construction of highways and railroads. The first railroad in the United States was chartered in 1827, and construction began in 1828.

== English colonies ==
=== Jamestown ===
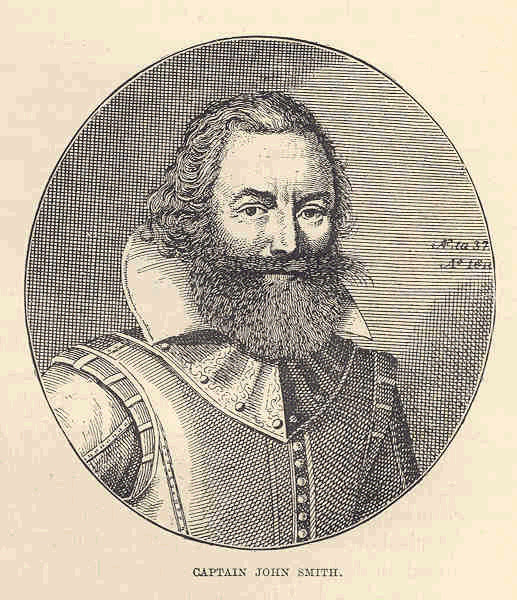
Captain John Smith

England established Jamestown in its Colony of Virginia in May 1607. Slightly over one year later, an attempt was made to produce glass in the colony. At the time, glassmaking back in England failed to thrive because the use of wood as fuel for glassmaking furnaces was discouraged and eventually prohibited. While England would later develop the first glassmaking furnace powered by coal, it was still in the early stages of development. This fuel problem led England to become dependent on Venice and other European cities for its glass needs. In contrast, North America appeared to have a massive number of forests, having great potential for glassmaking. The Virginia Company of London sent supplies to Jamestown that arrived in October 1608. Accompanying the supplies were eight men with manufacturing skills, including glassmaking. The men were said to be "Dutch" and Polish, although the Dutch men were probably German—and are identified as German by most historians. (Note: The term that native Germans use to describe themselves is "Deutche", and this may have caused confusion between "Dutch" and "Deutche". An example of this misconception is the term "Pennsylvania Dutch", which actually refers to a group of people who came from a German-speaking region of Europe. In 1916, it was thought that in the United States "nine out of ten speak of a Dutchman when a German is meant".) Captain John Smith, explorer and leader of the colony, discussed the difficulties of making glass in the new colony.

The site of the Jamestown glass works was described by Smith and mentioned by writer William Strachey. Ruins were discovered in 1931, leading to the belief that the Jamestown glass works was located about one mile (1.6 km) from Jamestown at a place now known as Glass House Point. Some structural and artifact evidence was discovered in the 1920s. Although still speculative and lacking good evidence, it is theorized that bottles or beads were produced. Glassmaking began shortly after the first glassworkers arrived, with the supply ship carrying sample glassware on its return voyage. In the spring of 1609, a "tryall of glasse" was produced. It is believed that production of glass ended during the difficult winter of 1609–1610, a period known as the Starving Time. Although this attempt to produce glass cannot be called a long-term success, it can be concluded that glass was first produced in Jamestown during the Fall of 1608, the first American glass factory was located at Jamestown, and this was the first industrial production by the English in North America. (Note: Glassmaking was conducted in Spanish colonial Mexico, in Puebla, during the 1530s.)

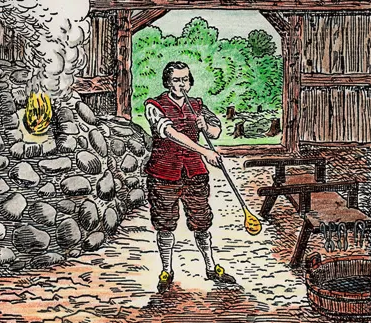
Glassblower working

In 1621, plans were made to revive glassmaking at Jamestown. The plan was for beads and "drinckinge Glasse" products to be produced by four Italian men who would come to Jamestown with their families. The glassworkers sailed for Jamestown in late August 1621. A glass house was constructed, but the Massacre of 1622 and sickness delayed progress. No glass had been produced by June 1622. The exact location of the glass works used in 1622 is unknown, with no definitive evidence of the type of glass produced. It is known that beads were traded with the local Native Americans, so it is possible that glass beads were the intended product. There is evidence that the furnace was working during March 1623, but due to issues with the quality of sand, output was said to be near zero. After the winter of 1623–1624, the glass works became inactive. In April 1625 it was decided to end the glassmaking project. Production failure was attributed to inadequate security, food supply, quality of sand, and disagreement among supervisors and glass workers. Although glass was produced at Jamestown, longer term success did not happen in 1608 or during a second attempt in the 1620s. The National Park Service exhibits the Jamestown furnace ruins at Glasshouse Point, and glassmakers in a nearby reconstructed glasshouse produce glass objects using 17th century methods.

=== Northern colonies ===
The Colony of Massachusetts Bay was located north of Jamestown. There, in 1639, colonists Obadiah Holmes and Lawrence Southwick formed a partnership to start a glassmaking facility. A year later, they were joined by glassman Ananias Concklin. Together, they received funding from the town of Salem, Massachusetts, in 1641. According to a Southwick family descendant, "hollow ware and bottles" were made at the glass works in "light green, dark green, blue and brown glass." They also described "bulls eyes for windows and doors" that were made, which implies the Crown method was used for making window glass. Some historians believe the works operated sporadically until as late as 1661, while others believe it shut down earlier in 1642 or 1643.

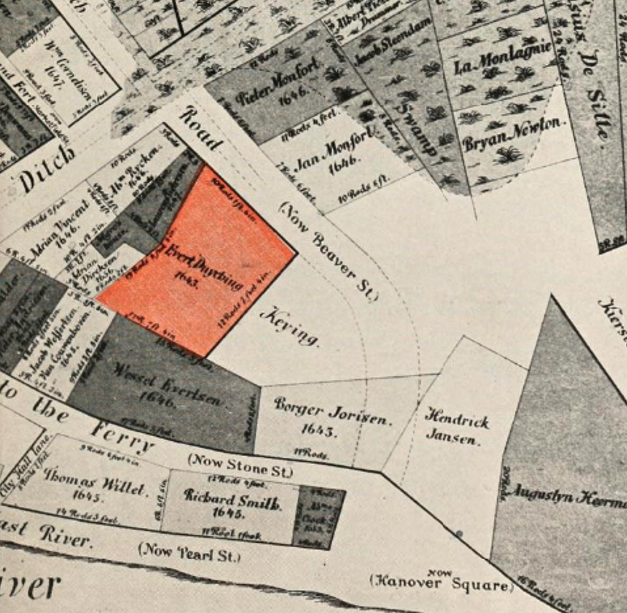
Duycking land in New Amsterdam

During the 1620s, the Dutch colony in North America maintained the New Amsterdam trading post and settlement in what is now the lower part of Manhattan in New York City. Everett Duijcking (Note: Also spelled "Evert Duycking" or "Evert Duyckingk".) established a glassmaking facility in the colony around 1645. Duijcking was a German from Westphalia, although his native town was close to the border with the Netherlands. Jacob Melyer (Note: Also spelled "Jacob Milyer".) took over Duijcking's glass works in 1674. The Melyer family is believed to have continued making glass into the third and fourth generations. If true, glass may have been produced in Manhattan from 1645 to about 1767.

Johannes Smedes, (Note: Johannes Smedes was also known as "Jan".) another New Amsterdam glassmaker, received a portion of land in 1654 adjacent to what became known locally as "Glass-makers Street". (Note: Smedes has also been spelled as "Smeedes".) In 1664, the same year Dutch occupation ended, Smedes sold his glass works and moved to Long Island. His products were believed to be window glass, bottles, and house wares. Other glassmakers in the New Amsterdam–New York area included Routoff Jansen and Cornelius Dirkson, who first sharpened their skills working for Smedes.

The Free Society of Traders built a glass factory close to Philadelphia in the Province of Pennsylvania during the early 1680s. The works, located at Frankford, was managed by Joshua Tittery, who was also a potter. They produced bottles and window panes for several years under the guidance of English glass blowers. Glass making was not a productive endeavor in the Pennsylvania Colony; Tittery had more success producing pottery. A 1684 letter written by Philip Lehman, secretary to William Penn, the founder of the colony, confirms the demise of the glass factory: "[The] Glasshouse comes to nothing". Pressure from investors led to the abandonment of glassmaking by 1685. (Note: An older source, Knittle, calls this works the "Chester Creek Glass Works". She states that the works was built in Delaware County, managed by Tittery, and already abandoned by 1685.)

=== Future glassmaking ===
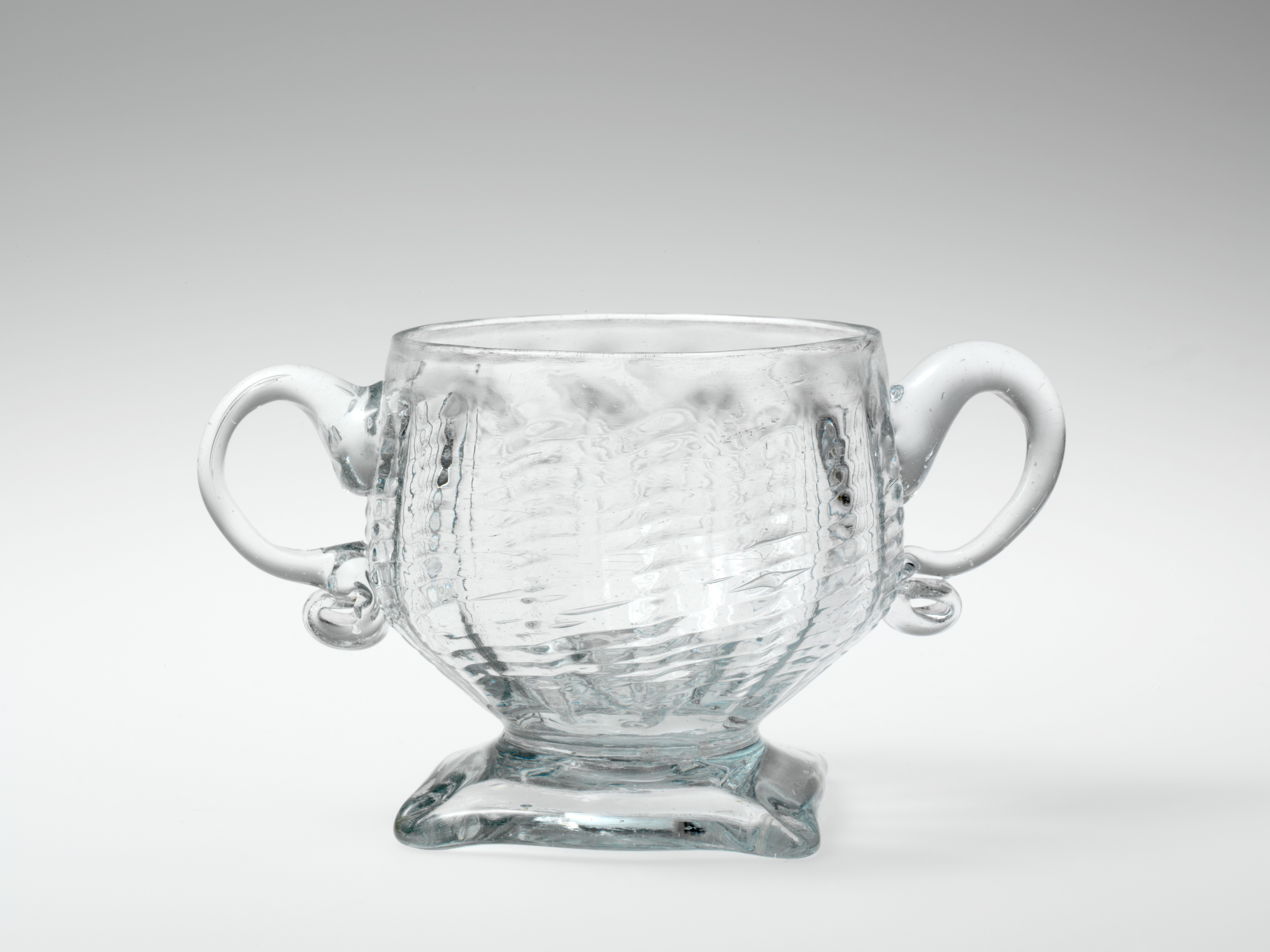
Stiegel sugar bowl, Metropolitan Museum of Art

Over one dozen glass works operated in the British colonies and after the American Revolution, during the 18th century, as several milestones were achieved. German-immigrants Caspar Wistar, Henry William Stiegel, and John Frederick Amelung were responsible for three of these successes. In the Province of New Jersey, Wistar's glass works was the first to achieve large-scale, long-term success. Stiegel's glass works in the Province of Pennsylvania was the first in America to make fine lead crystal, which is often mislabeled as flint glass. Amelung invested more money in glassmaking than anyone ever had and produced impressive quality glass with engraving—although his Maryland glass works failed after 11 years.

Additional milestones were made with fuel. From its beginning, American glassmakers used wood as the fuel for their furnaces that melted the raw ingredients for glass. Philadelphia's Kensington Glass Works, around 1771, may have been the first American glass plant to use coal to power its furnace. In the 1790s, the O'Hara and Craig glass works was the first glass works in Pittsburgh, and this works was another early user of coal as a fuel for its furnaces.

By 1800, it is thought that roughly ten glass works were operating in the United States. Challenges for American glass works revolved around labor, raw materials, and imports. European nations made immigration to the United States illegal for glassmakers as part of an effort to keep their glassmaking knowledge from spreading. Some American businessmen resorted to smuggling glassworkers. However, the glassmakers themselves kept their techniques and recipes secret. If a company lost a skilled glassworker, it was possible that certain types of glass could no longer be made at the glass works. The labor problem began to be solved in the early 19th century when Boston businessman Deming Jarves began to keep records for glass recipes and procedures.

The American glass manufacturers also had to compete with English glassmakers. By 1740, English glassmakers produced good quality window glass and some of the best lead crystal glassware available. English trade restrictions caused most of the glassware purchased in America before the American Revolutionary War to be English–made. Raw materials for crystal glassware were also an issue. England controlled the only known supply of red lead, an ore necessary for the production of fine lead crystal glassware. This meant that American crystal cost more than that made in England because prices for red lead were kept high. Jarves solved the red lead problem in the early 19th century when he developed a way to make red lead using domestic sources. Finally, high quality sand was necessary to make high quality crystal glassware. England controlled the supply of high quality sand, and brought it to the United States as ballast in their ships. After the War of 1812, local sources of high quality sand were found in the Berkshires, Monongahela River, and New Jersey.

== Notes ==
=== Bibliography ===
- Alexander, Rani (2019). Technology and Tradition in Mesoamerica after the Spanish Invasion ... Albuquerque, New Mexico: University of New Mexico Press. ISBN 978-0-82636-015-1. OCLC 1057243820.
- Baker, Josephine Turck, ed. (February 1913). "Holland Dutch". Correct English – How to Use It. 12 (2). Evanston, Illinois: Correct English Publishing Company: 27. OCLC 1774694. Archived from the original on November 8, 2023.
- Charleston, Robert J. (1978). "Glass Furnaces Through the Ages". Journal of Glass Studies. 20: 9–33. JSTOR 24190485.
- Cotter, John L. (1958). "Archeological Excavations at Jamestown". Archeological Research Series (4). National Park Service, U.S. Department of the Interior: 1–299. OCLC 1118452. Archived from the original on November 3, 2023.
- Dyer, Davis; Gross, Daniel (2001). The Generations of Corning: The Life and Times of a Global Corporation. Oxford: Oxford University Press. ISBN 978-0-19514-095-8. OCLC 45437326.
- Gillingham, Harrold E. (1930). "Pottery, China, and Glass Making in Philadelphia". The Pennsylvania Magazine of History and Biography. LIV (2): 97–129. JSTOR 20086733. Archived from the original on December 4, 2023.
- Hatch, Charles E. (April 1941). "Glassmaking in Virginia, 1607–1625". The William and Mary Quarterly. 21 (2): 119–138. doi:10.2307/1923625. JSTOR 1923625. Archived from the original on October 27, 2023.
- Hatch, Charles E. (July 1941a). "Glassmaking in Virginia, 1607–1625 (Second Installment)". The William and Mary Quarterly. 21 (3): 227–238. doi:10.2307/1919822. JSTOR 1919822. Archived from the original on November 2, 2023.
- Hommel, Rudolph P. (October 1947). "Hilltown Glass Works (A Preliminary Report)" (PDF). The Bulletin of the Historical Society of Montgomery County. VI (1): 24–28. Archived (PDF) from the original on December 21, 2023.
- Hunter, Frederick William (1914). Steigel Glass. Boston, Massachusetts: Houghton Mifflin Co. OCLC 1383707. Archived from the original on December 4, 2023.
- Knittle, Rhea Mansfield (1927). Early American Glass. New York, New York: The Century Co. OCLC 1811743. Archived from the original on 2023-07-19.
- Kutilek, Luke (2019). "Flat Glass Manufacturing Before Float". In Sundaram, S. K. (ed.). 79th Conference on Glass Problems: A Collection of Papers Presented at the 79th Conference on Glass Problems, Greater Columbus Convention Center, Columbus, Ohio, November 4–8, 2018. Hoboken, New Jersey: John Wiley & Sons, Inc. (issued by American Ceramic Society). pp. 37–54. ISBN 978-1-11963-155-2. OCLC 1099687444.
- Lanmon, Dwight P.; Palmer, Arlene M. (1976). "The Background of Glassmaking in America". Journal of Glass Studies. 18 (Special Bicentennial Issue): 14–19. JSTOR 24190008. Archived from the original on October 27, 2023.
- Madarasz, Anne; Historical Society of Western Pennsylvania; Senator John Heinz Pittsburgh Regional History Center (1998). Glass: Shattering Notions. Pittsburgh, Pennsylvania: Historical Society of Western Pennsylvania. ISBN 978-0-93634-001-2. OCLC 39921461.
- McKearin, Georghe S.; McKearin, Helen (1966). American Glass. New York City: Crown Publishers. OCLC 1049801744.
- Nash, Gary B. (April 1965). "The Free Society of Traders and the Early Politics of Pennsylvania". The Pennsylvania Magazine of History and Biography. 89 (2). Philadelphia, Pennsylvania: Historical Society of Pennsylvania: 147–173. JSTOR 20089791. Archived from the original on December 7, 2023.
- Palmer, Arlene (1976). "Glass Production in Eighteenth-Century America: The Wistarburgh Enterprise". Winterthur Portfolio. 11. Chicago, Illinois: University of Chicago Press on behalf of the Henry Francis du Pont Winterthur Museum Inc.: 75–101. doi:10.1086/495842. JSTOR 1180591. S2CID 161635810. Archived from the original on November 17, 2023.
- Palmer, Arlene (1979). "A Philadelphia Glasshouse, 1794–1797". Journal of Glass Studies. 21. Corning, New York: Corning Museum of Glass: 102–114. JSTOR 24190039. Archived from the original on December 4, 2023.
- Poor, Henry V. (1868). Poor's Manual of Railroads for 1868–69. New York City: H.V. & H.W. Poor. OCLC 5585553. Archived from the original on May 21, 2023.
- Purvis, Thomas L. (1999). Colonial America to 1763. New York City: Facts on File. ISBN 978-1-43810-799-8. OCLC 234080971.
- Skrabec, Quentin R. (2007). Michael Owens and the Glass Industry. Gretna, Louisiana: Pelican Publishing. ISBN 978-1-45560-883-6. OCLC 1356375205.
- Skrabec, Quentin R. (2011). Edward Drummond Libbey, American Glassmaker. Jefferson, North Carolina: McFarland. ISBN 978-0-78648-548-2. OCLC 753968484.
- Shotwell, David J. (2002). Glass A to Z. Iola, Wisconsin: Krause Publications. pp. 638. ISBN 978-0-87349-385-7. OCLC 440702171.
- Tillotson, E. Ward (December 1920). "Modern Glass-Making – Putting the Glass Industry on a Scientific Basis". Scientific American Monthly. II (4). New York City: Scientific American Publishing Company: 351–354. Archived from the original on November 17, 2023.
- United States Department of Commerce, Bureau of Foreign and Domestic Commerce (1917). The Glass Industry. Report on the Cost of Production of Glass in the United States. Washington: Government Printing Office. OCLC 5705310.
- Weeks, Joseph D.; United States Census Office (1884). Report on the Manufacture of Glass. Washington, District of Columbia: U.S. Government Printing Office. OCLC 2123984. Archived from the original on July 16, 2023.
- Zerwick, Chloe (1990). A Short History of Glass. New York: H.N. Abrams in association with the Corning Museum of Glass. ISBN 978-0-81093-801-4. OCLC 20220721.
