= Pitkin Glassworks Ruin =

Archaeological site in Connecticut, United States

- U.S. National Register of Historic Places
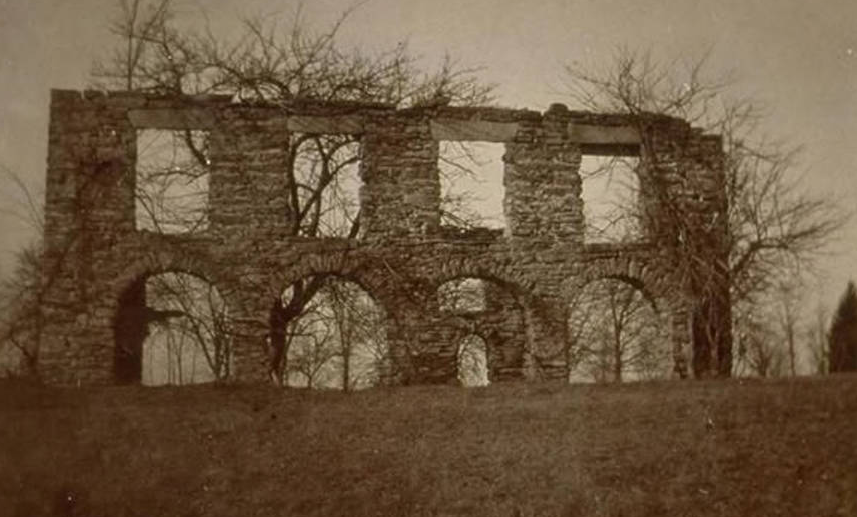
- Ruins, c. 1892
- Location: Putnam and Parker Streets, Manchester, Connecticut
- Coordinates: 41°46′36″N 72°30′15″W
- NRHP reference No.: 79002628
- Added to NRHP: May 9, 1979

The Pitkin Glassworks Ruin is a historic industrial archaeological site at the Junction of Parker and Putnam Streets in Manchester, Connecticut. It contains the remains of one of the oldest glass factories in New England, established in 1783. It was listed on the National Register of Historic Places in 1979.

== History ==
The Pitkin Glass Factory was established when the area was still considered part of East Hartford, and was known at the time as the East Hartford Glass Works. William and Elisha Pitkin had supplied gunpowder to the Continental Army during the American Revolutionary War at a financial loss, and petitioned the state in 1783 for an exclusive right to manufacture glass as compensation for their losses. The state granted them a 25-year monopoly, to begin once manufacturing began. The factory went into operation a few years later, and soon ran into financial difficulties. Several lotteries were held to raise additional funds, but the endeavour finally closed its doors in 1830.

The factory produced items mostly made of green glass, including demijohns for trade with the West Indies, as well as all manner of utilitarian containers, from inkwells to pitchers and bowls. It is unclear whether or not they manufactured window glass.

== Later history ==
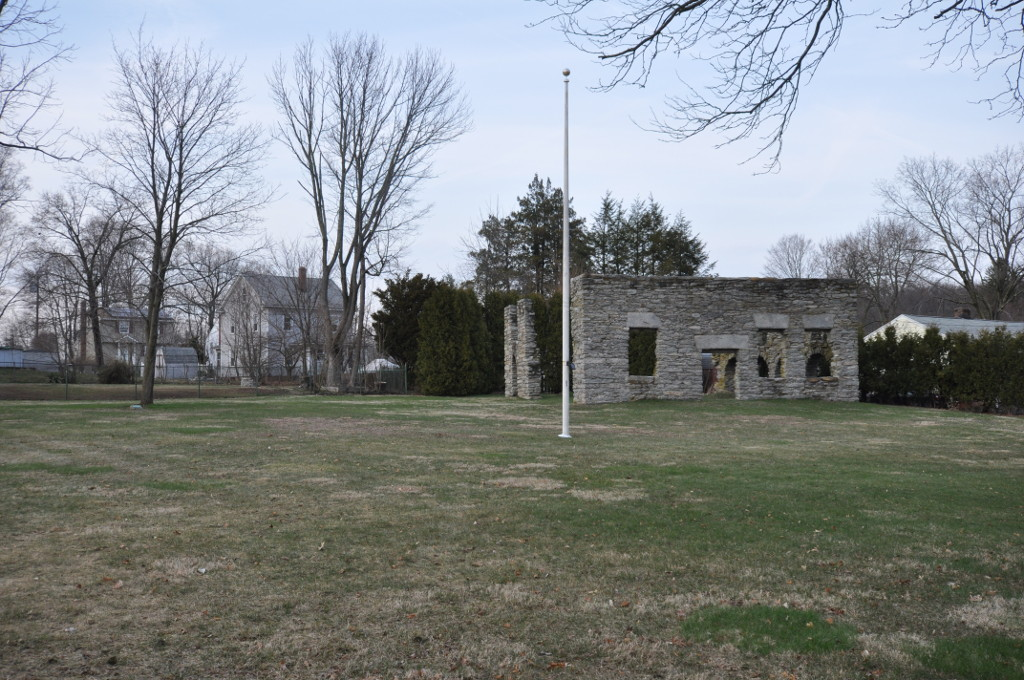
The ruins in 2018

The ruins of the structure of the factory are located on what was once the Pitkin Farm, and what is currently the corner of Putnam and Parker Streets. Between the two streets is a grassy plot of land with a sign that identifies it as the former site of the Pitkin Tavern. The site includes remnants of the factory's stone walls, as well as other archaeological remains.

The ruined remains of the factory were deed by the Pitkin family to the Daughters of the American Revolution (DAR) in 1928. The DAR, citing increasing maintenance costs, suggested selling the property for development in 1977. In response to this threat, a committee of citizens formed to save it. They include members of the DAR and the Manchester Historical Society.

Several archaeological digs have taken place on the site, including one done by students at Central Connecticut State University. Displays of artifacts and the history of the site are located in the Old Manchester Museum on Cedar Street.

== See also ==
- New England Glassworks, founded in 1780 in Temple, New Hampshire
- National Register of Historic Places listings in Hartford County, Connecticut
- 18th century glassmaking in the United States
