= Amelung =

Amelung may refer to:

- any member of the Amal dynasty
- Ed Amelung (b. 1959), American baseball outfielder
- Friedrich Amelung (1842–1909), Baltic German cultural historian, businessman and chess player.
- Günter Amelung (1914–1944), German World War II officer
- Heinz-Günter Amelung (1917–1964), German World War II Luftwaffe officer
- John Frederick Amelung (1741–1798), German-American glass artist
- Walther Amelung (1865–1927), German archaeologist
