= Free Society (disambiguation) =

Free Society may refer to:

- Free Society, a defunct anarchist newspaper in the United States
- Free Society (magazine), a magazine published by the Cato Institute.

Free Society may also refer to:

- Free Society of Traders, a company founded by a small group of Quakers in colonial Pennsylvania
- Free Society of Lovers of Literature, Science, and the Arts, a Russian literary and political society active in the early 19th Century
- Free Society of Teutonia, a defunct Nazi organization in the United States
