= Amelung House and Glassworks =

Historic house in Maryland

- U.S. National Register of Historic Places
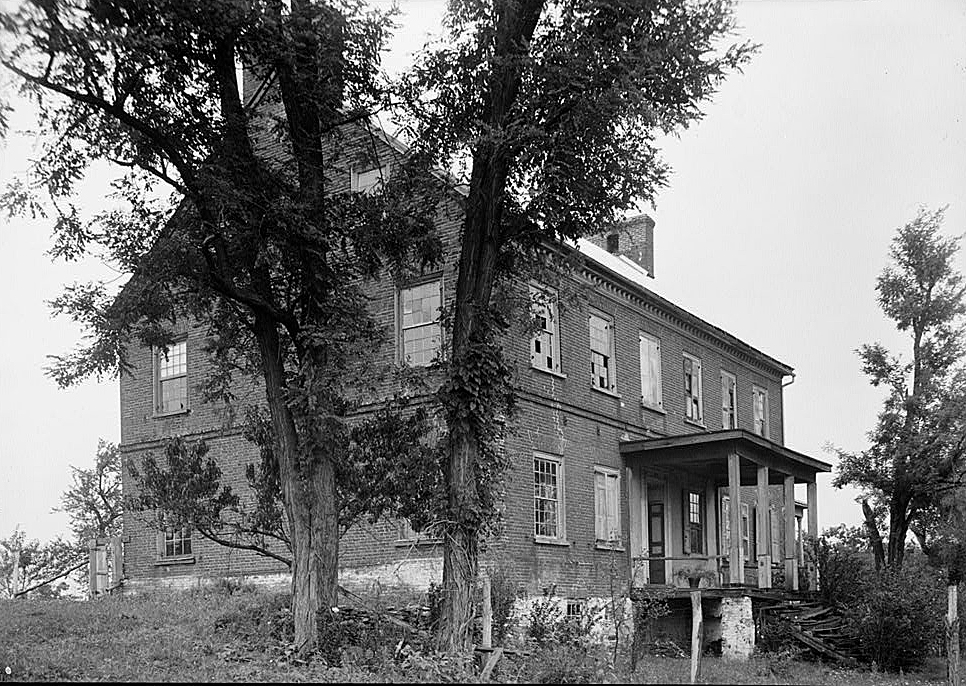
- Amelung house in 1936

- Location within Maryland Location within the United States
- Location: 2531 Park Mills Road, Urbana, Maryland
- Coordinates: 39°18′2″N 77°24′11″W
- Area: 40 acres (16 ha)
- Built: 1785
- Architectural style: Georgian, Late Georgian
- NRHP reference No.: 73000919
- Added to NRHP: October 3, 1973

The Amelung House and Glassworks is a historic home located at Urbana, Frederick County, Maryland, United States. It is a two-story, late-Georgian brick home on a stone foundation built about 1785. The property once had the New Bremen glassworks built by Johann Friedrich Amelung after he came to Maryland in 1784; no above-ground remains of the factory remain. Fine examples of New Bremen glass work may be seen at the Metropolitan Museum of Art in New York City; the Corning Museum of Glass in Corning, New York; and Winterthur Museum in Winterthur, Delaware.

The Amelung House and Glassworks was listed on the National Register of Historic Places in 1973.
