= New England Glassworks =

- New England Glassworks Site
- U.S. National Register of Historic Places
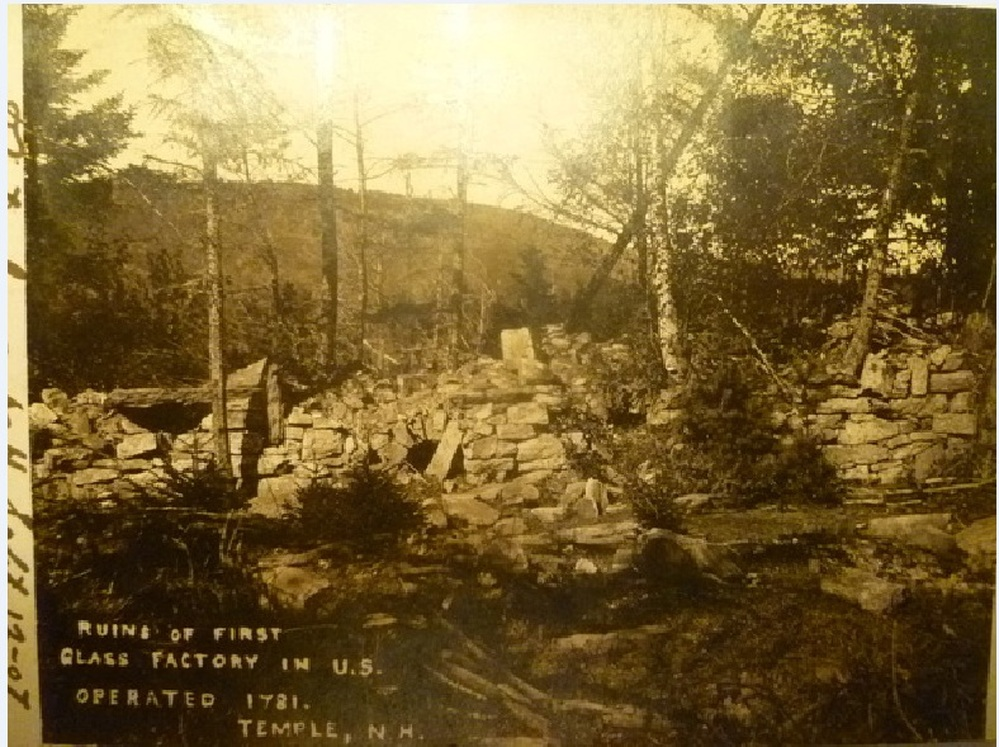
- 1907 photograph of the glassworks ruins
- Location: near the town line with Sharon
- Nearest city: Temple, New Hampshire
- Built: 1780
- Built by: Hewes, Robert
- NRHP reference No.: 75000127
- Added to NRHP: June 10, 1975

The New England Glassworks was a short-lived glass-making factory located in Temple, New Hampshire in the 1780s, and one of the first glassworks in the United States. Founded in 1780 by Robert Hewes, a Boston-based businessman, the glassworks employed Hessian deserters from the British forces of the American Revolutionary War. The glassworks was established in 1780 and failed due to a lack of financing in 1783. Its abandoned site was excavated in the 1970s, and is now listed on the National Register of Historic Places.

== History ==
The remote site (on the outer portions of rural Temple, near its border with Sharon) was chosen because of ready access to trees for firewood, necessitating the hauling of other materials to the site.

The factory was beset by financial and logistical difficulties which ultimately led to its failure. The first building, constructed at Hewes' expense, was destroyed by fire not long after its completion. The glass furnaces were damaged by frost before rebuilding was completed, after which Hewes appealed first to the town and then the state for additional financial support. In 1781 the state authorized a lottery to raise up to £2,000 in support of the effort. The lottery was a failure, and the glassworks eventually failed. The quality of its products (window glass, bottles, and similar household items) was not particularly good, since the sand used in the glass was apparently sourced locally and of poor quality.

== Archeology ==
The glassworks site was excavated in the 1970s, in what archeologist David Starbuck in 2006 termed "the largest industrial dig ever conducted" in New Hampshire. According to artifacts recovered there, the site produced window glass, small bottles, and "vessels suitable for chemistry". The main glasshouse was determined to be about 65 feet (20 m) square, containing a glass furnace of German design.

The site of the glassworks was listed on the National Register of Historic Places in June 1975.

== See also ==
- National Register of Historic Places listings in Hillsborough County, New Hampshire
- 18th century glassmaking in the United States
