= Free Society of Traders =

The Free Society of Traders was a company of merchants, landowners, and personal associates of William Penn who were granted special concessions in order to direct the economy of what was at the time a young colony. Most were Quaker merchants from London and Dublin.

It was originally a joint-stock company launched in London in 1681 by Nicholas More, James Claypoole, and Philip Ford, after Penn received his Royal charter from Charles II that March. Some of the concessions made to these men in order to attract financial support, Penn offered early (100) investors a bonus of 5,000 acres each, plus exclusive rights to property in the capital city. Said property was to be meted out as property dividends in proportion to their country land at an annual 2% interest in their initial purchase. Penn also fashioned a rudimentary form of own government from the Traders' members. Such offers were extended to entice early colonizers.

Society Hill, a neighborhood of Philadelphia, is named after the Free Society of Traders, which had its offices at Front Street on the hill above Dock Creek.
