= John Frederick Amelung =

German-American glass artist (c. 1741–1798)

- Johann Friedrich Amelung
- Born: c. 1741 or 1742; Bremen, Free City of Bremen
- Died: 1798; Maryland, U.S.
- Known for: Founder of New Bremen Glass manufactory, German-style engraved glass
- Style: Decorative glass
- Patrons: George Washington, Thomas Jefferson, Benjamin Franklin (supported business)

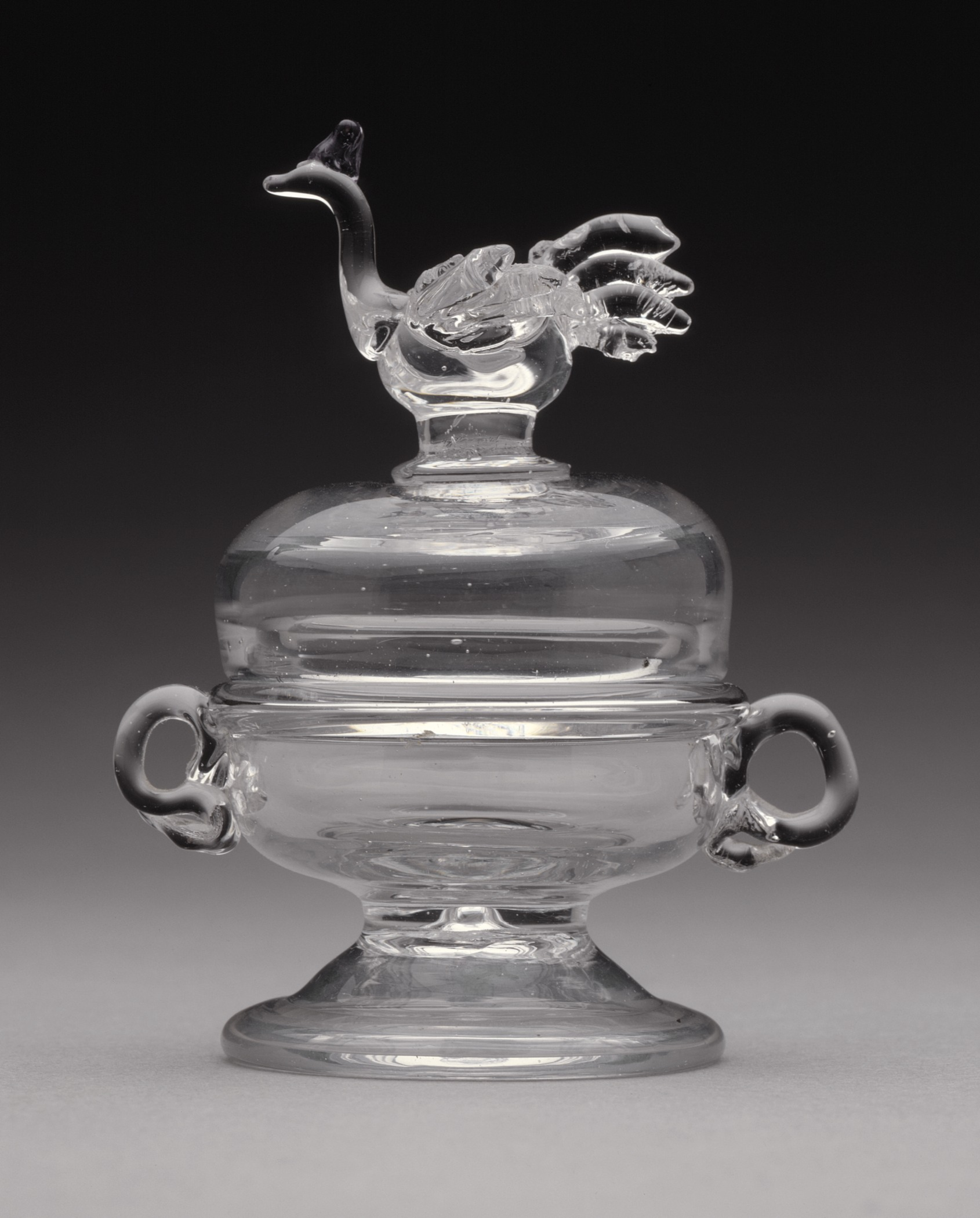
Sugar bowl from a child's tea set, Los Angeles County Museum of Art

John Frederick Amelung (c. 1741–1798) was a German-American glass artist active in Maryland.

== Biography ==
He was born in the free city of Bremen in either 1741 or 1742. A glassmaker by trade, Amelung immigrated to Baltimore, Maryland in 1784. In Maryland, he became the founder of the New Bremen Glass manufactory. The company had the support of people like George Washington, Thomas Jefferson, and Benjamin Franklin.

The business produced decorative glass similar to Stiegel glass from 1784 to about 1795. Some of the glass products contained engraved decorative ornaments in the German style. The company made detailed pieces including works for the brother of Maryland's first governor, Thomas Johnson. His business was successful, benefiting from the young American nation's desire for economic independence from Great Britain. The factory suffered a fire to part of its complex during its first decade in business. A loan request for expansion was denied in 1790.

Amelung died in Maryland in 1798.

== See also ==
- 18th century glassmaking in the United States
