= 19th-century glass categories in the United States =

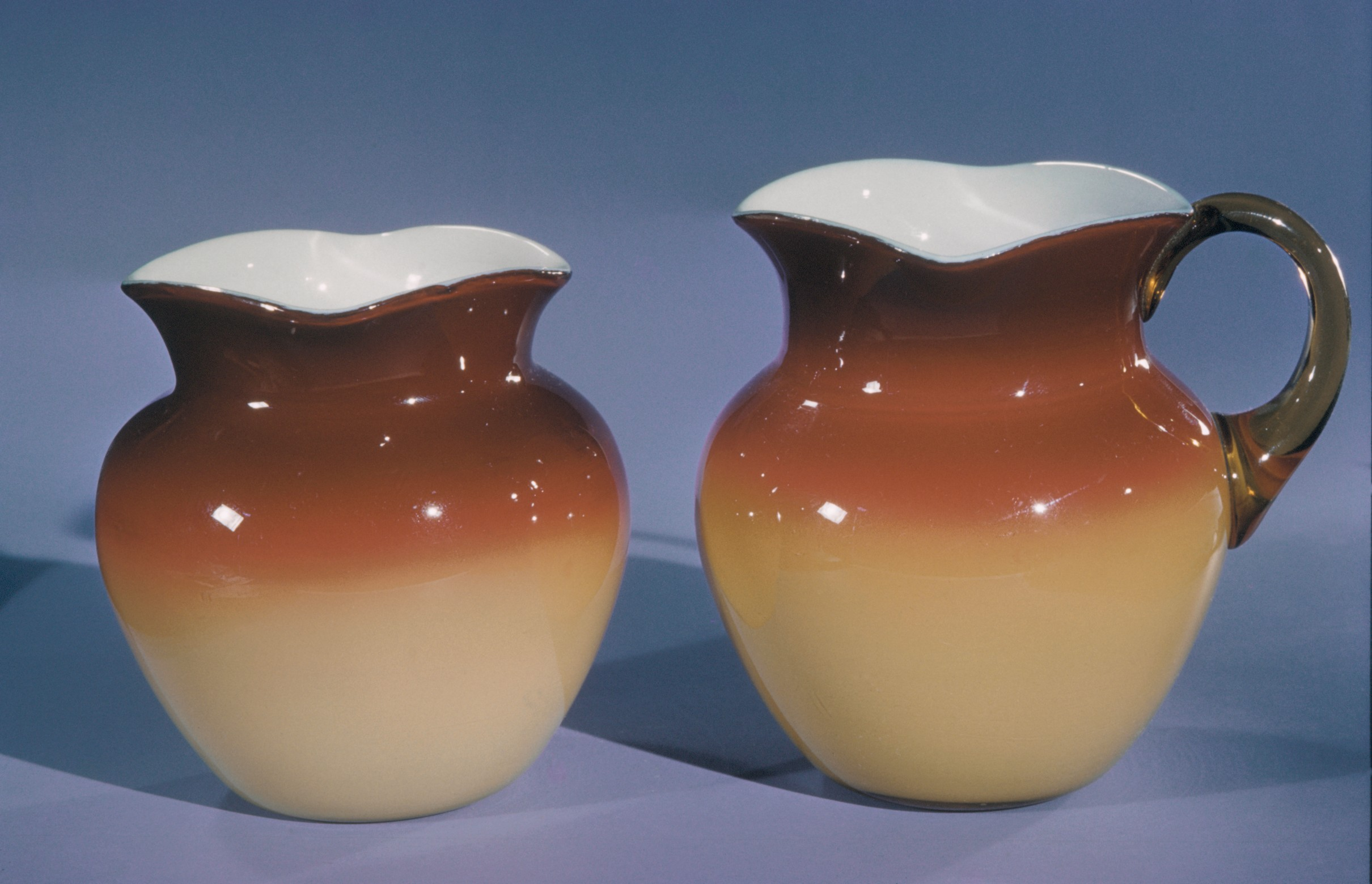
Blown peachblow glass creamer made in 1880s by Hobbs, Brockunier and Co. Metropolitan Museum of Art

19th-century glass categories in the United States include types of glass and decoration methods for glass. A simplified category version appropriate at the beginning of the century is glassware, bottles, and windows. As the century progressed, glass production became more complex and made necessary more categories and subcategories. An 1884 United States government report used glassware, bottles, windows, and plate glass as major categories—although plate glass accounted for only four percent of the value of all glass made.

Although window glass was made using the Crown method or the Cylinder method at the start of the century, the cylinder method was dominant by mid-century. By the 1870s, glassware could be lead crystal or made from soda-lime, with crystal including lead as a key additive while soda-lime glass excludes lead. Glassware could also be decorated by cutting, engraving, or etching. Bottles continued to be made with low–quality green glass, but some bottles were made with high–quality glass and decorated.

During the last decade of the century, wire glass was being produced in addition to window and plate glass. One government report used the category "building glass" to represent window, plate, and wire glass. Shatter-resistant glass was invented in Europe and would be introduced by an American manufacturer in 1915. Research was being conducted in the United States and Europe that would dramatically change the way window glass was manufactured in the next century. In France, Émile Fourcault was developing the Fourcault process for making window glass. In the United States, Irving Wightman Colburn would later be joined by Michael J. Owens to develop a similar window making process.

== Background ==
Prior to the American Revolution, there were three types of glass made in the British colonies that would become the United States. Those categories were green glass, soda glass, and lead glass. In 1800, the United States was thought to have no more than ten operating glass factories. Most of these factories produced window glass or bottles made of green glass, and very little high quality glassware was made. (Note: The production of higher quality crystal glass in the United States was limited by a lack of skilled glassblowers and lack of a necessary additive for the raw ingredients. Almost all of the crystal glassware in the United States was imported from England, and England controlled the supply of the necessary additive for crystal—red lead.) Despite the War of 1812 and a trade war with Britain, the United States had at least 33 glass factories by 1820. The Tariff of 1824, which was a protective tariff, helped the American glass industry grow to nearly 70 glass factories over the next two decades. By the middle of the century, the United States had 94 glass works producing various types of glass—including glassware. Leading glassware manufacturers in the 1870s were Bakewell, Pears, & Company; Boston & Sandwich Glass; J. B. Dobleman; J. H. Hobbs, Brockunier and Company; Mount Washington Glass; and New England Glass Company.

In 1884 the Census Office of the United States Department of the Interior released Report on the Manufacture of Glass by Joseph D. Weeks. This report, which contained over 100 pages, used four "general varieties" to classify glass plus additional "sub–varieties". (Note: Warren C. Scoville, in his journal entry titled Growth of the American Glass Industry to 1880, described the Census Office report as "Weeks's excellent report", and produced a table using Weeks' four categories. He also wrote that "...the increased efficiency of the Census enable one to ascertain the state of the industry in 1880 with much greater accuracy than in any previous year.") For the 1880, 169 establishments produced glass products in the United States. Glassware was produced at 73 facilities, while green glass was made at 42. Window glass was made at 49 glass works, while plate glass was made at five establishments. The total value of all glass products produced was $21,154,571 (equivalent to $705,760,257 in 2025). Glassware accounted for 45 percent of the total value of glass products made in 1880; while green glass, window glass, and plate glass had percentages of 27, 24, and four, respectively.

The total value of all glass products produced in the United States grew to $41,051,004 (equivalent to $1,470,994,310 in 2025) in 1889, and for 1899 it was $56,539,712 (equivalent to $2,188,086,854 in 2025). (Note: The Bureau of Foreign and Domestic Commerce report published in 1917 shows statistics for 1879 on page 24 and 25 that match the numbers for 1880 in the 1884 report by Weeks and the Census Office. Weeks calls his numbers "Summary of Statistics for 1880" and "The complete statistical results of the census of 1880....") Bottles and jars accounted for about 38 percent of the 1899 total, while building glass (window, plate, wire, other building) and pressed & blown glass (mostly glassware) both accounted for about 30 percent. (The other two percentage points are rounding plus an "All other products" category.)

== Major categories of glass ==
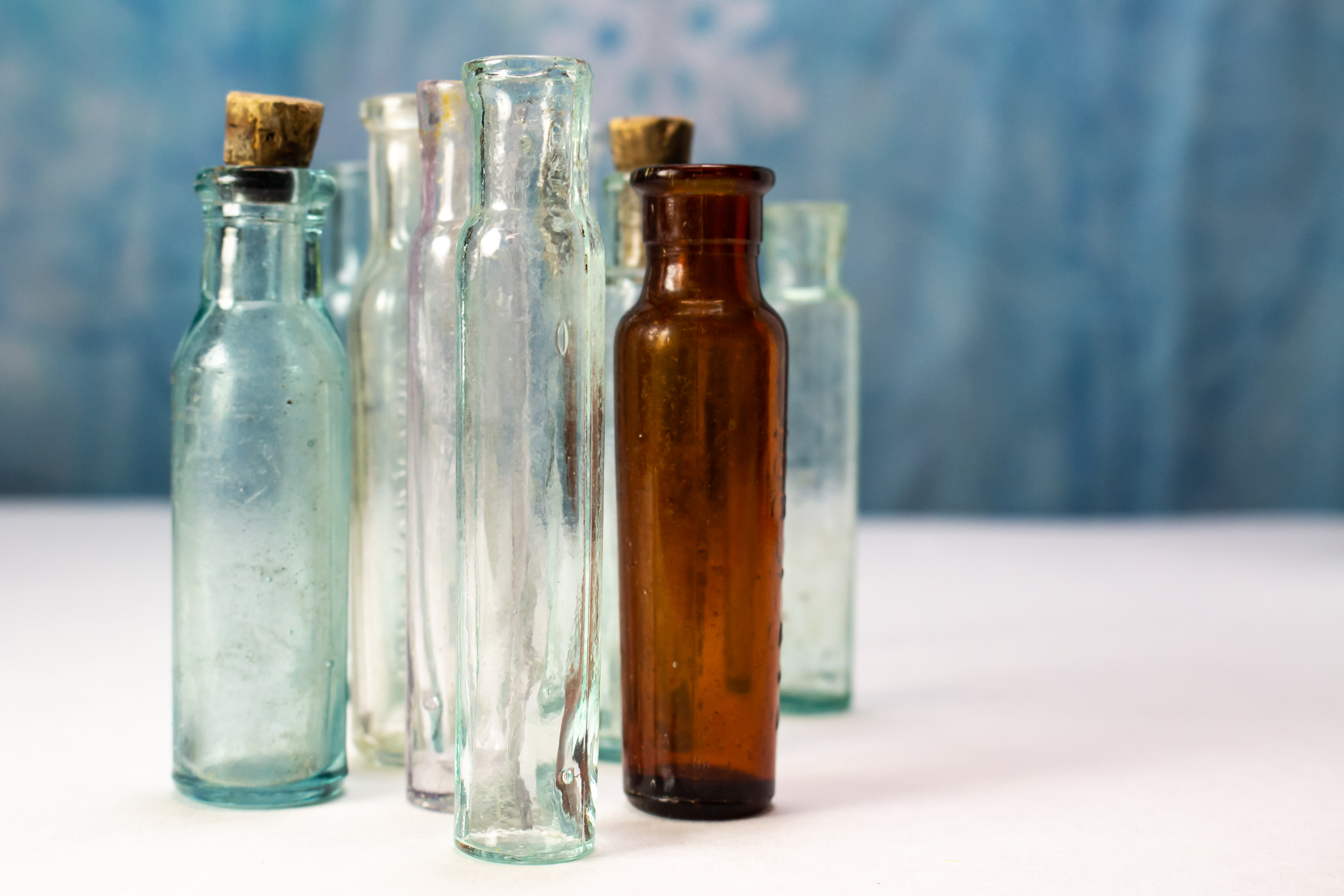
Medicine bottles

- Flint glass is usually glassware, although it can be bottles and lamp chimneys. The glass composition could either include lead (usually called crystal) or soda and lime (soda–lime glass). In the 21st century, flint glass refers to crystal.
- Green or "bottle" glass has a clear greenish (sometimes brownish) color because of impurities such as iron in the sand used in the batch—and a lack of additives used to remove the greenish tint or add a more pleasing color. In the English colonies that would become the United States, most glass produced was green glass until the 1760s when one glass works began producing high quality lead crystal. Green glass of the 19th century is different from green glass, such as Uranium glass, deliberately colored green by using additives.
- Plate glass was made by pouring molten glass onto a table, and then polishing it after it hardened. Plate glass is generally thicker than window glass, takes longer to anneal, and undergoes intensive grinding and polishing to produce its finish. It is used for mirrors, tabletops, and large windows.
- Window glass production during most of the 19th century involved a glassblower making a long hollow cylinder that was cut lengthwise and flattened—known as the Cylinder method. By the end of the 19th century, the Lubbers glassblowing machine was created to eliminate the need for glassblowers in the window glass process, and work began early in the next century that would radically change the entire production method.

== Other categories of glass ==
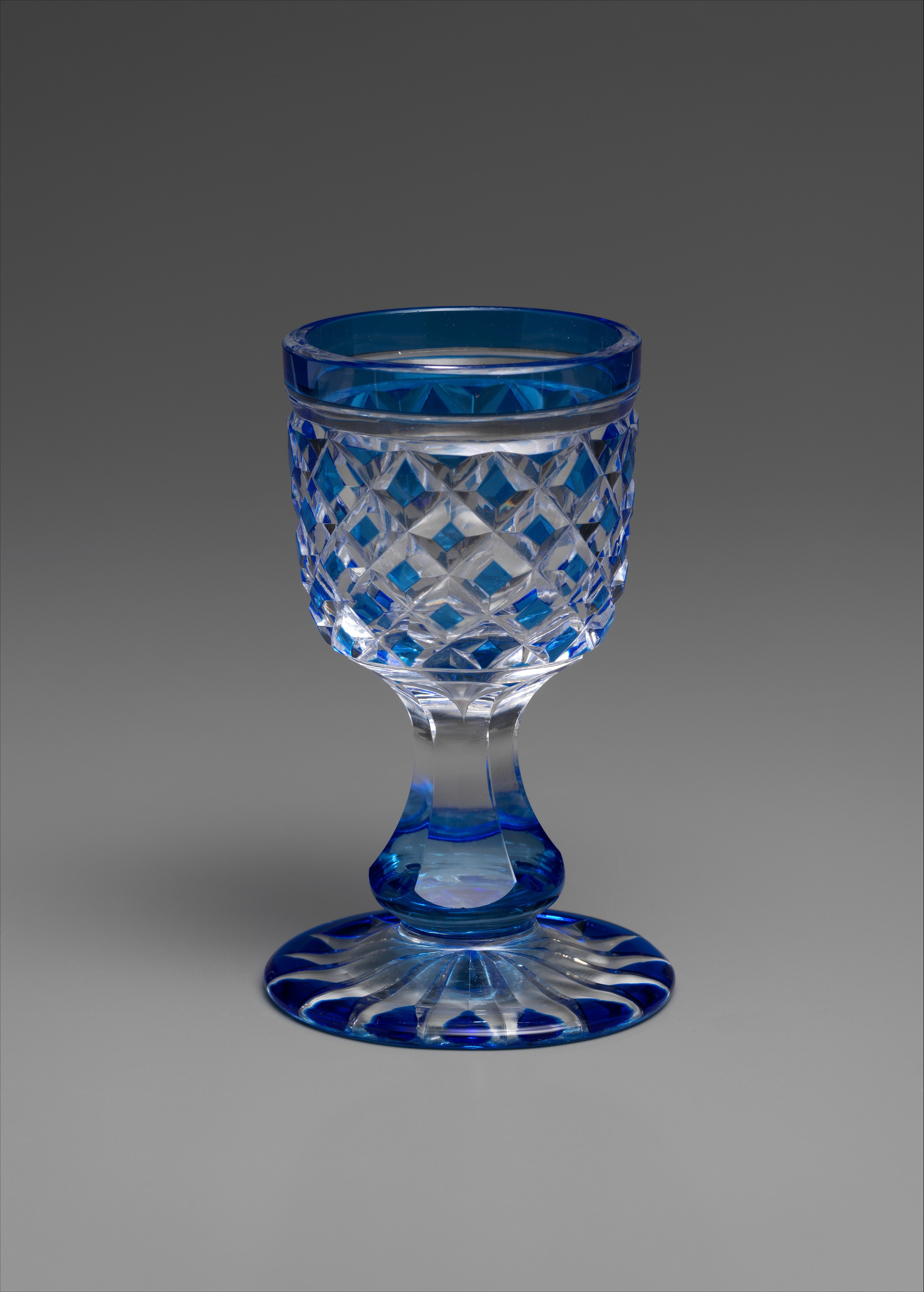
Brooklyn Flint Glass Co. cut crystal glass ~ 1850–1855 Metropolitan Museum of Art

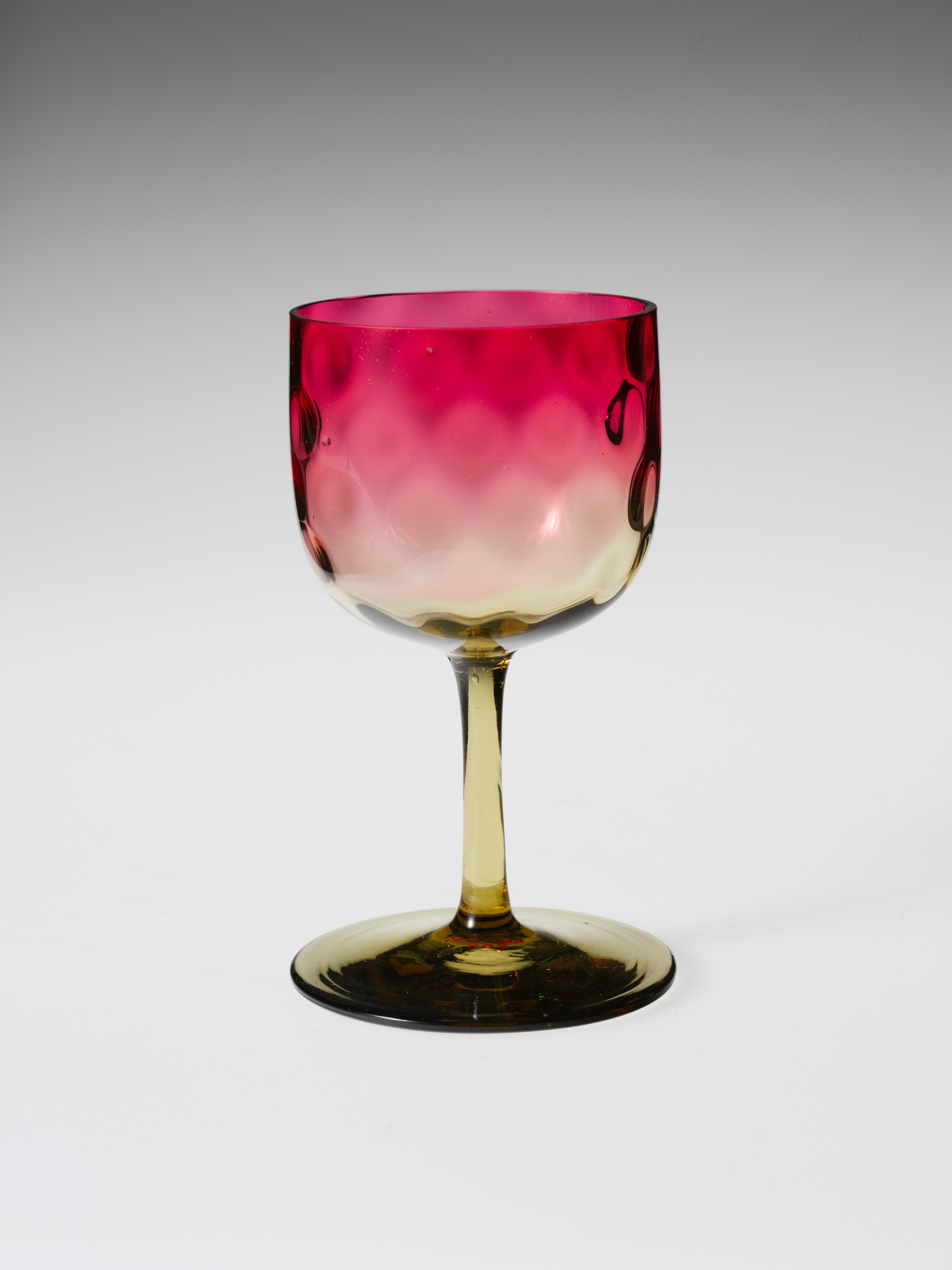
J.H. Hobbs, Brockunier & Co. wine glass (soda–lime) ~ 1885 Metropolitan Museum of Art

- Borosilicate glass was created between 1887 and 1893 in Germany by Otto Schott. This type of glass is less likely to shatter because it is tolerant to sudden changes in temperature. Borosilicate glass was not made in the United States until 1915, when Corning Glass Works introduced its Pyrex glass.
- Crystal glass (sometimes called flint glass) is a high-quality clear glass that needs an additive known as red lead. In the British colonies that would become the United States, crystal began being produced right before 1770 by a works led by Henry William Stiegel in the Province of Pennsylvania. The Stiegel works ended production in 1774. Glass works such as New England Glass Company, and Pittsburgh's Bakewell glass works, were producers of crystal early in the 19th century. (Note: New England Glass Company moved to Toledo, Ohio, in 1888 and was renamed Libbey Glass Company in 1892. Pittsburgh's Bakewell glass works had nine different names. From 1808 to 1809 it was named Bakewell & Ensell; and from 1809 to 1813 it was named Benjamin Bakewell & Company. From 1813 to 1827 it was named Bakewell, Page & Bakewell; and from 1827 to 1832 was named Bakewell, Page & Bakewells. From 1832 to 1836 it was named Bakewells & Anderson; and from 1836 to 1842 it was named Bakewells & Company. The Pears family became involved and the company was named Bakewell & Pears from 1842 to 1844; Bakewell, Pears & Company from 1844 to 1880; and Bakewell, Pears Company, Ltd. from 1880 to 1882.) The Seneca Glass Company was one of the few glass works still making lead crystal glassware late in the 19th century, and it continued using 19th century technology through much of the 20th century.
- Soda–lime glass (a.k.a. lime–soda glass or lime glass) was re–discovered in 1864 by William Leighton of the J. H. Hobbs, Brockunier and Company glass works in Wheeling, West Virginia. The glass made using his formula had good enough quality that the company could compete in the high-end of the glassware market. The ingredients used to make the glass were lower-cost than those used to make lead glass. In addition, the glass hardened faster, meaning the workforce was forced to shape or press it quicker. Professor Warren C. Scoville of the Massachusetts Institute of Technology, in an essay titled Growth of the American Glass Industry to 1880, considered the new soda-lime formula second only to mechanical pressing among the five outstanding American glassmaking innovations up to that time.
- Window glass, crown method was made by having a glassblower blow a gob of glass until it was shaped like a hollow globe. The globe was transferred from the glassblower to a worker where the globe would be cut open and twirled with a rod as it flattened into a large disc. When the worker removed the rod used for twirling, it would leave a "bullseye" in the center of the glass. The disc would be annealed in a kiln for two to three weeks. A cutter would then cut the flattened glass into the desired dimensions. In the United States, the few window glassmaking companies that used the crown method ended production using that process shortly after 1850, although some crown glass was made at the end of the century for decorative purposes.
- Window glass, cylinder method starts like the crown method, only the gob of glass is blown into a large hollow cylinder. The cylinder is cut on both ends, and then cut lengthwise so it can be flattened in a flattening oven. Although window glass made using the cylinder method did not have as good of a finish as that made using the crown method, it had a more uniform thickness of the glass which caused fewer distortions. It also could be cut into bigger pieces with less waste. This method was the only one used to make window glass in the United States during the last half of the 19th century. By 1920 it was mostly replaced by radically different methods for making window glass. (Note: The Fourcault process for window glass was invented in 1901 by a Belgian glassmaker named Émile Fourcault. This process uses a machine to draw molten glass vertically, and has no need for a glassblower or glassblowing machine. By 1925, window glass manufacturers were using as many as 14 drawing machines had been placed over one furnace. Annealing the glass is also quicker than the cylinder method. The process was finalized in Belgium, and was not used in the United States until 1923 when it began being used by the Blackford Window Glass Company in Vincennes, Indiana.) (Note: The Libbey-Owens process (also called the Colburn process) began being developed by Irving Wightman Colburn after he observed a paper–making machine in 1905. Another source believes Colburn was inspired by noticing that while eating pancakes, syrup remained on his knife blade as he lifted it—causing him to consider the possibility of molten glass being pulled up in a similar manner. After running out of funding, Colburn's patents were sold at auction in 1912. The patents were purchased by the Toledo Glass Company, which was owned by Edward Libbey and Michael Owens. Colburn and Owens continued work on Colburn's process, and by 1917 it was improved enough to produce window glass. In this process, glass is melted in a tank furnace before moving into a trough where it is drawn. The glass is drawn vertically, but after it reaches a bending roller it is drawn horizontally. Annealing is conducted in a lehr that is 20 feet (6.1 m) long.) In the United States, the last window glass company to use the cylinder method was the LeFevre Glass Company in 1926.
- Wire glass, a variation of plate glass made after 1892, uses wire within the glass as reinforcement. Frank Shuman developed the process for embedding wire in glass. (Note: E. Ward Tillotson, Assistant Director of Mellon Institute of Industrial Research, spelled Frank Shuman's surname as "Schuman" and credited the introduction date as 1892.)

== Decorating glass ==
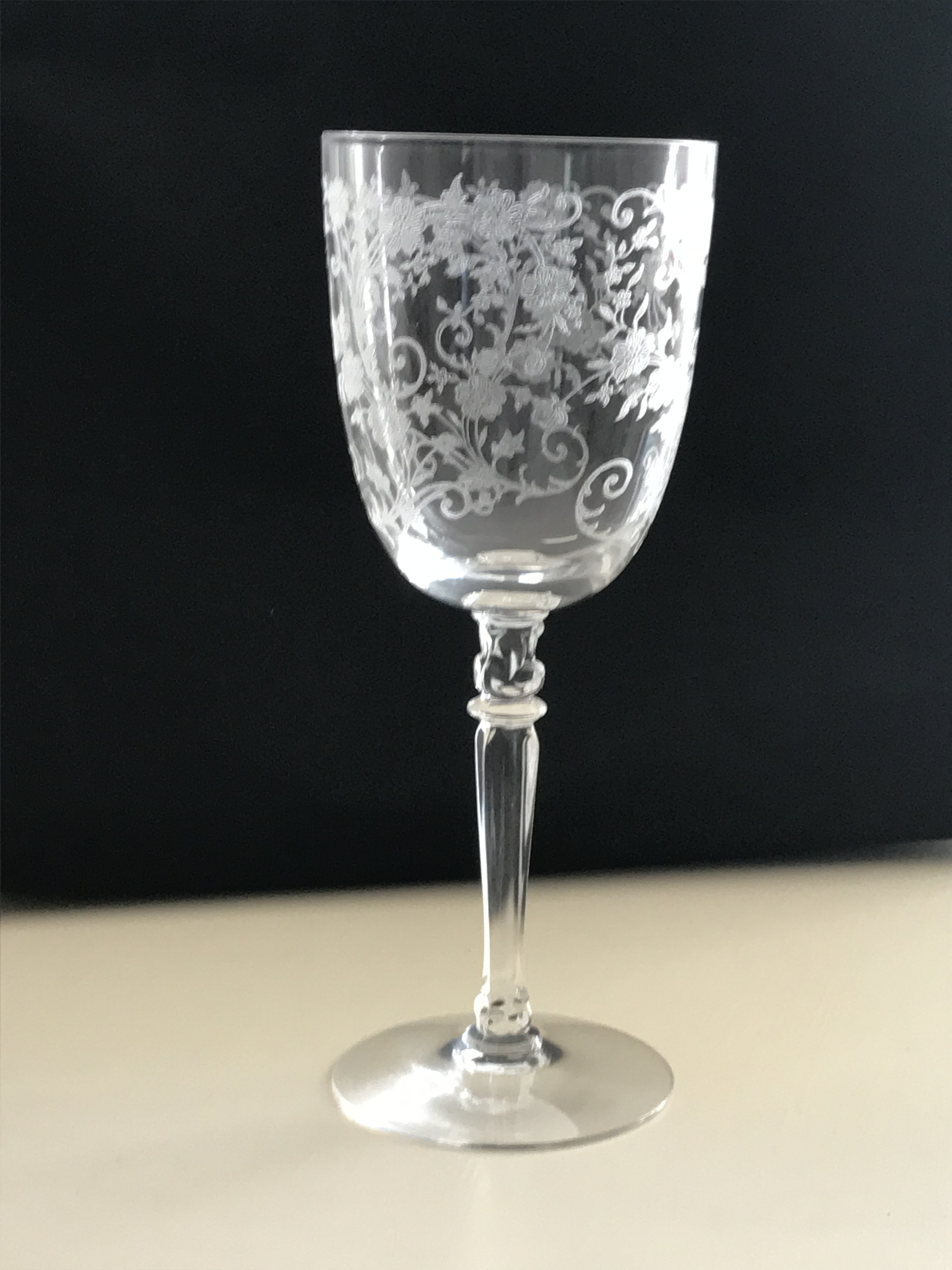
Fostoria Glass Co. etched stemware

- Cased glass consists of at least two layers of different colored glass. Also known as overlay glass, this technique did not see extensive use until the 1850s, and peaked in production during the 1860s.
- Cut glass has been decorated by cutting groves or depressions in its surface. The process involves making the cut, smoothing, and then polishing. The work was done by a glass cutter holding the glass against a wheel on a lathe. The Romans are known to have cut glass, and glass cutting was rediscovered by Germans in the 17th Century. The technique spread to the British Isles before it was brought to the United States during the late 18th Century. Pittsburgh's Bakewell and Company was an early 19th century glassmaking firm that became known for its cut glass.
- Enameled glass has been decorated by enamel paint. The enamel typically contained lead, tin, and a metallic oxide ground into a powder. It was mixed with an oil and fused to the glass. It may have been practiced in New Amsterdam by Dutch glassmakers, and was definitely used in Pennsylvania by Henry William Stiegel's Manheim glasshouse during the 1770s. The Consolidated Lamp and Glass Company, the largest producer of lamps and shades in the United States in the 1890s, produced as many as 400 dozen hand–painted lamps per day.
- Engraved glass in the 19th century United States was made using copper wheels on a lathe. It is a more exacting method of decoration compared to cutting glass. It was introduced to the English colonies (eventually the United States) by German glass workers during the last half of the 18th century.
- Etched glass has been decorated by using chemicals. The glass is covered with an acid-resistant wax, portions of the wax are scratched off, and the acid is applied. This technique was used mainly in the late 19th century.
- Gilded glass has been decorated with gold paint. The gold is paint consists of brown oxide of gold or a gold salt mixed with oil or water. Firing the paint onto the glass leaves it dull until it is polished. Gilding was probably not practiced in the United States until about 1820.

== Notes ==
=== References ===
- Consolidated Lamp and Glass Company (April 1896). "As Others See Us (advertisement)". Glass and Pottery World. IV (4). Chicago, Illinois: American Glass and Pottery World Company: 36. Archived from the original on March 1, 2024.
- Dyer, Davis; Gross, Daniel (2001). The Generations of Corning: The Life and Times of a Global Corporation. Oxford: Oxford University Press. ISBN 978-0-19514-095-8. OCLC 45437326.
- Linton, Robert (May 1917). "Window Glass by Machine". Compressed Air Magazine. xxii (5). Easton, Pennsylvania: Compressed Air Magazine Company: 8359–8364. OCLC 1564586. Archived from the original on March 3, 2024.
- Madarasz, Anne; Historical Society of Western Pennsylvania; Senator John Heinz Pittsburgh Regional History Center (1998). Glass: Shattering Notions. Pittsburgh, Pennsylvania: Historical Society of Western Pennsylvania. ISBN 978-0-93634-001-2. OCLC 39921461.
- McKearin, Georghe S.; McKearin, Helen (1966). American Glass. New York City: Crown Publishers. OCLC 1049801744.
- Palmer, Arlene (1979). "American Heroes in Glass: The Bakewell Sulphide Portraits". American Art Journal. 11 (1). Chicago, Illinois: University of Chicago Press, Smithsonian American Art Museum: 4–26. doi:10.2307/1594129. JSTOR 1594129. Archived from the original on February 24, 2023.
- Purvis, Thomas L. (1999). Colonial America to 1763. New York City: Facts on File. ISBN 978-1-43810-799-8. OCLC 234080971.
- Shotwell, David J. (2002). Glass A to Z. Iola, Wisconsin: Krause Publications. pp. 638. ISBN 978-0-87349-385-7. OCLC 440702171.
- Scoville, Warren C. (September 1944). "Growth of the American Glass Industry to 1880". Journal of Political Economy. 52 (3): 193–216. doi:10.1086/256182. JSTOR 1826160. S2CID 154003064. Archived from the original on November 13, 2023.
- Skrabec, Quentin R. (2007). Michael Owens and the Glass Industry. Gretna, Louisiana: Pelican Publishing. OCLC 137341537.
- Skrabec, Quentin R. (2011). Edward Drummond Libbey, American Glassmaker. Jefferson, North Carolina: McFarland. ISBN 978-0-78648-548-2. OCLC 753968484.
- Swiatosz, Susan (1985). "A Technical History of Late Nineteenth Century Windows in the United States". Bulletin of the Association for Preservation Technology. 17 (1): 31–37. doi:10.2307/1494065. JSTOR 1494065. Archived from the original on January 30, 2024.
- Tillotson, E. Ward (December 1920). "Modern Glass-Making – Putting the Glass Industry on a Scientific Basis". Scientific American Monthly. II (4). New York City: Scientific American Publishing Company: 351–354. Archived from the original on November 17, 2023.
- Turner, W.E.S. (July 1925). "The Modern Production of Sheet Glass". Journal of the Royal Society of Arts. 73 (3792): 821–837. JSTOR 41357024. Archived from the original on February 29, 2024.
- United States Department of Commerce, Bureau of Foreign and Domestic Commerce (1917). The Glass Industry. Report on the Cost of Production of Glass in the United States. Washington: Government Printing Office. OCLC 5705310.
- United States Tariff Commission (1937). "Flat Glass and Related Glass Products". Report Under the General Provisions of Section 332, Title III, Part II, Tariff Act of 1930. 123 (2): 1–277. OCLC 12562332. Archived from the original on February 24, 2024.
- Weeks, Joseph D.; United States Census Office (1884). Report on the Manufacture of Glass. Washington, District of Columbia: U.S. Government Printing Office. OCLC 2123984. Archived from the original on July 16, 2023.
- Wilson, Joseph M.; Wahl, William H. (March 1894). "Shuman's Process and Apparatus for Embedding Wire Netting in Glass". Franklin Institute of the State of Pennsylvania, for the Promotion of the Mechanic Arts. CXXXVII (3): 161–175. Archived from the original on March 3, 2024.
