= Bryce Brothers =

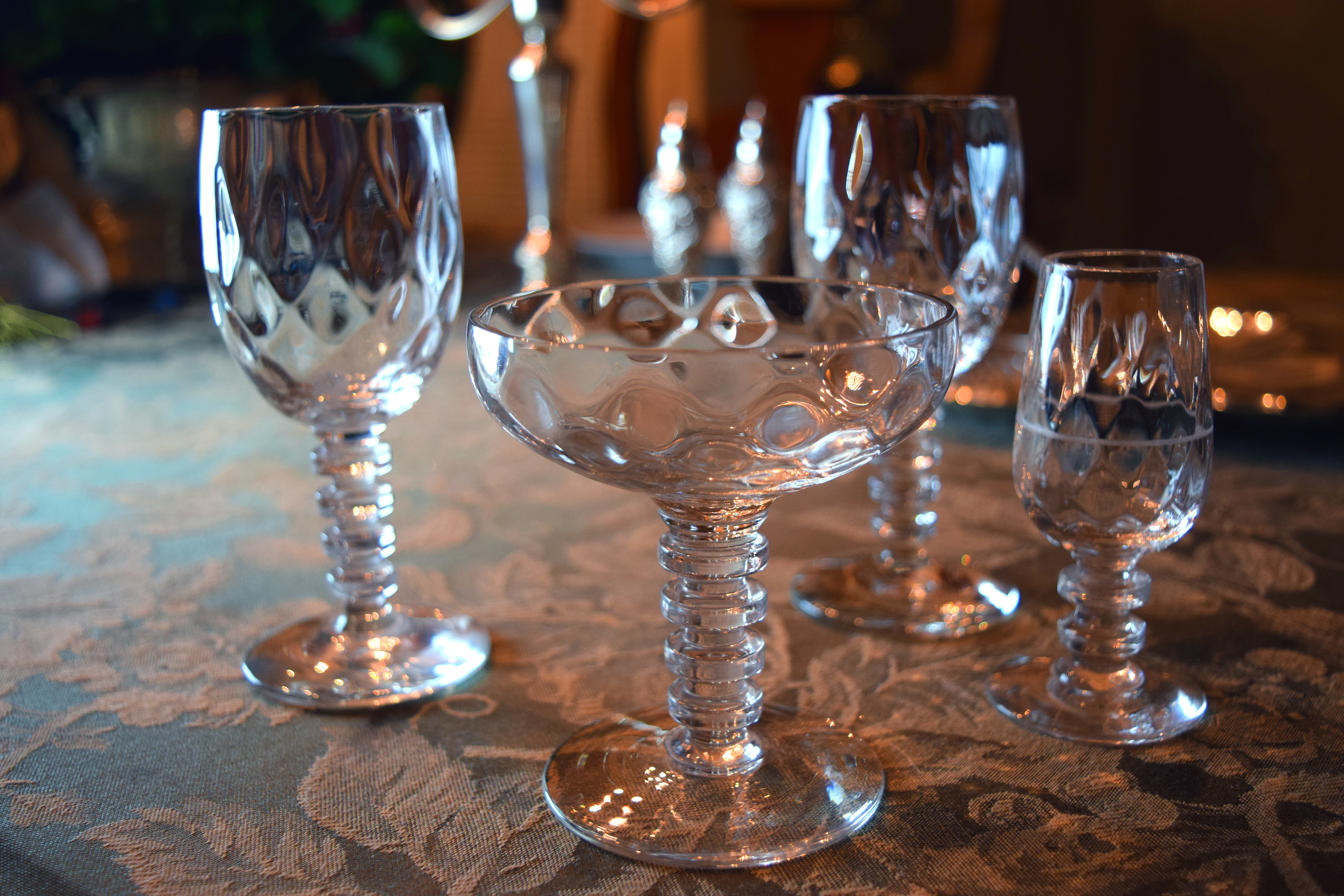
Bryce Brothers diamond optic, multi knob blown crystal stemware

Bryce Brothers, also known as Bryce Brothers Company and Bryce Brothers Company Inc., was a glass manufacturing company originating in 1850 at Birmingham, Allegheny County, Pennsylvania that changed names and partnerships until being purchased by the Bryce family when it was moved to Mount Pleasant, Pennsylvania, where they continued to produce blown crystal glassware until 1965.

== Origins ==
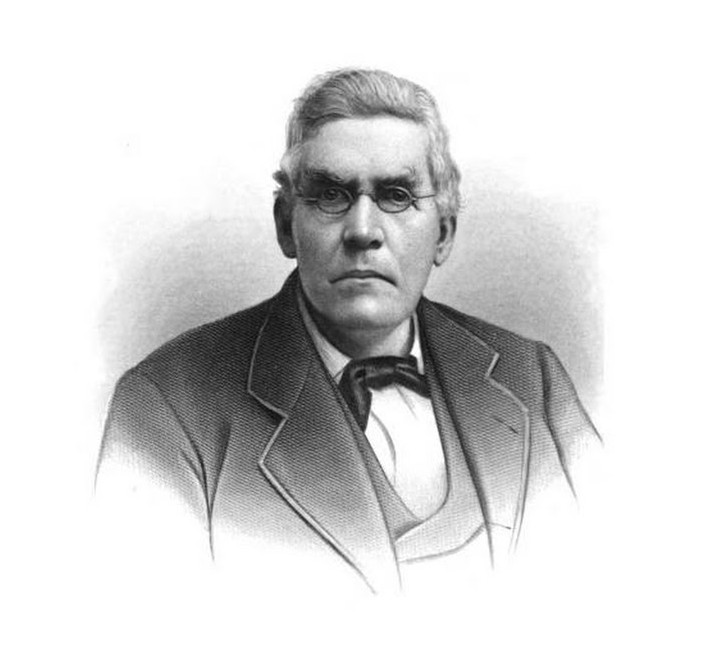
James Bryce, founder and patriarch of Bryce Brothers

James Bryce had been working in the glass industry since he was ten years old when his father, who was dying of lead poisoning as a result of his own work with glass, asked his employer, Mr. Bakewell, owner of the Bakewell Glass factory in Pittsburgh, Pennsylvania to apprentice his son, James with his company, Bakewell, Page and Bakewell. After working his way up to become one of several glassblowers, he would then spend 18 years as a journeyman. A panic in 1837 caused the glassworks to shut down and it would not be until 1845 until James Bryce would return to glass making.

THE INSET PHOTO IS INCORRECTLY IDENTIFIED. The glasses in the photo are: Bryce, Pattern Code BRY670DO. Description: Stem #670, Diamond Optic Bowl. Pattern: 670 (Diamond Optic) by Bryce. [source: REPLACEMENTS, LTD. WEB PAGE; Home / Crystal / Bryce / 670 (Diamond Optic).] The glasses shown are typical of Bryce's many variations of basic patterns in their early 20th century, deco designs, which they produced by mixing their many blown glass bowls (with many bowl patterns produced in both non-optic and various optic patterns) with a variety of their playful molded deco stems, with some of the stems being produced in many lengths and widths to suit the function of an attached bowl and to create deco drama. Color sometimes was added to either stems or bowls of any existing pattern, frequently adding the color to only one or a few of the bowl shapes in a particular pattern. [Sources for this latter info are Replacements Ltd. and my own experience of studying and collecting Bryce's MCM, Deco glass.]

In 1850 James formed his first business venture along with partners with whom he was senior, named; Bryce, McKee & Company. Over a period of time the company would undergo many changes in name and partnerships that also included Bryce, Richards & Company, as well as Bryce, Walker & Company. William Walker sold out his interest in his partnership in "Bryce, Walker & Company" to partners James Bryce, Robert D. Bryce, Andrew H. Bryce and David K. Bryce. Other partners included James M. Bryce, Samuel A. Bryce, Frank G. Bryce as well as the grandsons of James Bryce that included Marion G. Bryce and Edwin W. Bryce. On June 13, 1882 the company reformed as simply Bryce Brothers.
