= John Adams (glassmaker) =

American glass manufacturer

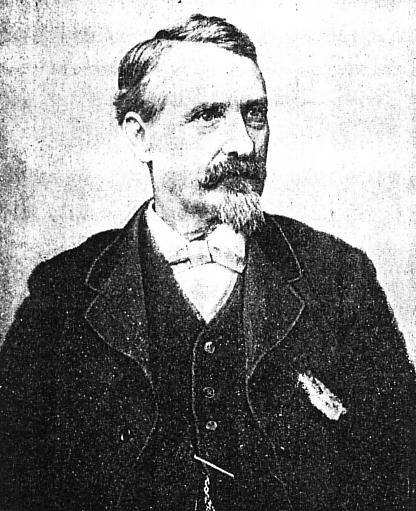
John Adams

John Adams (1823-1887) was a pioneer American glass manufacturer, and the founder of Adams Glass. He was born in Westmoreland County, Pennsylvania in 1823. He began working in glass manufacture at the age of 14.

== Life and work ==
He developed the technique of using lime in place of lead to make glass. This significantly lowered the cost of glass production. He made good use of this advantage, turning his factory, located in Pittsburgh, into a large and successful operation.

He was a major producer of kerosene lamps. Along with his sons Adolphus and William, he produced numerous artistic table glassware designs. They also made such unusual items as glass plow-shares, washboards, and coffins.

John Adams also served on the Pittsburgh City Council, was a director of the Iron & Glass Dollar Savings Bank, street railway companies and Flint Glass Association. He was an ardent Methodist, and lifelong Sunday school teacher.

== After death ==
Five years after John Adams’ death in 1886, his sons sold out their holdings in Adams & Company (also known as Adams Glass). The Adams & Company factory became “US Glass, Factory A”.

His daughter, Jennie Adams, became a well known missionary to China. She founded an orphanage, and supported it by her second occupation which was discovering and trading in Chinese antiquities.

There is an oral tradition among his descendants that John Adams was a related to the presidential Adams family. However, no evidence has been found to substantiate this claim.

John Adams and family remain united in death. Their tombstones are arranged in a circle, around a large Adams Family obelisk, located in the Pittsburgh, Southside Cemetery.
