= Bakewell Glass =

Glassware from Pittsburgh, Pennsylvania, US

Bakewell Glass is nineteenth-century glassware from Pittsburgh, Pennsylvania, produced by a company founded by Benjamin Bakewell. Bakewell's company can be found under the names The Pittsburgh Glass Manufactory, Bakewell & Page and, Bakewell, Pears & Co. Bakewell glass built a reputation of being both luxurious and utilitarian during the 80 years it was in business.

== Bakewell & Company ==
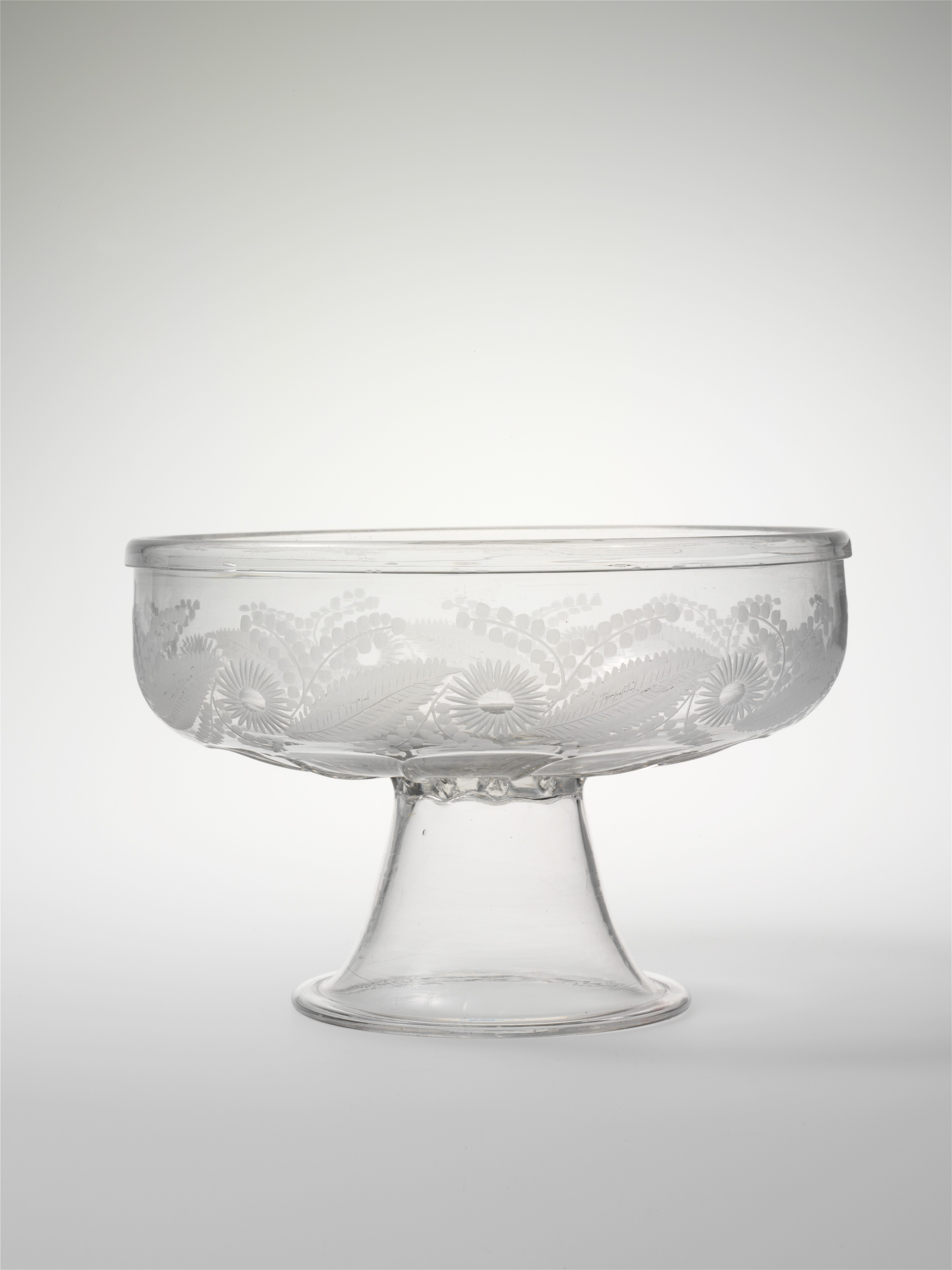
Blown and engraved glass by Bakewell, Pears & Co.

Records of Bakewell & Co are sparse, likely due to the 1845 Pittsburgh fire that wiped out many of the company's early records and the last 40 years worth of records being thrown out when the business closed down in 1882. The company was founded by English businessman Benjamin Bakewell when he saw future success in the industry in the early 1800s.

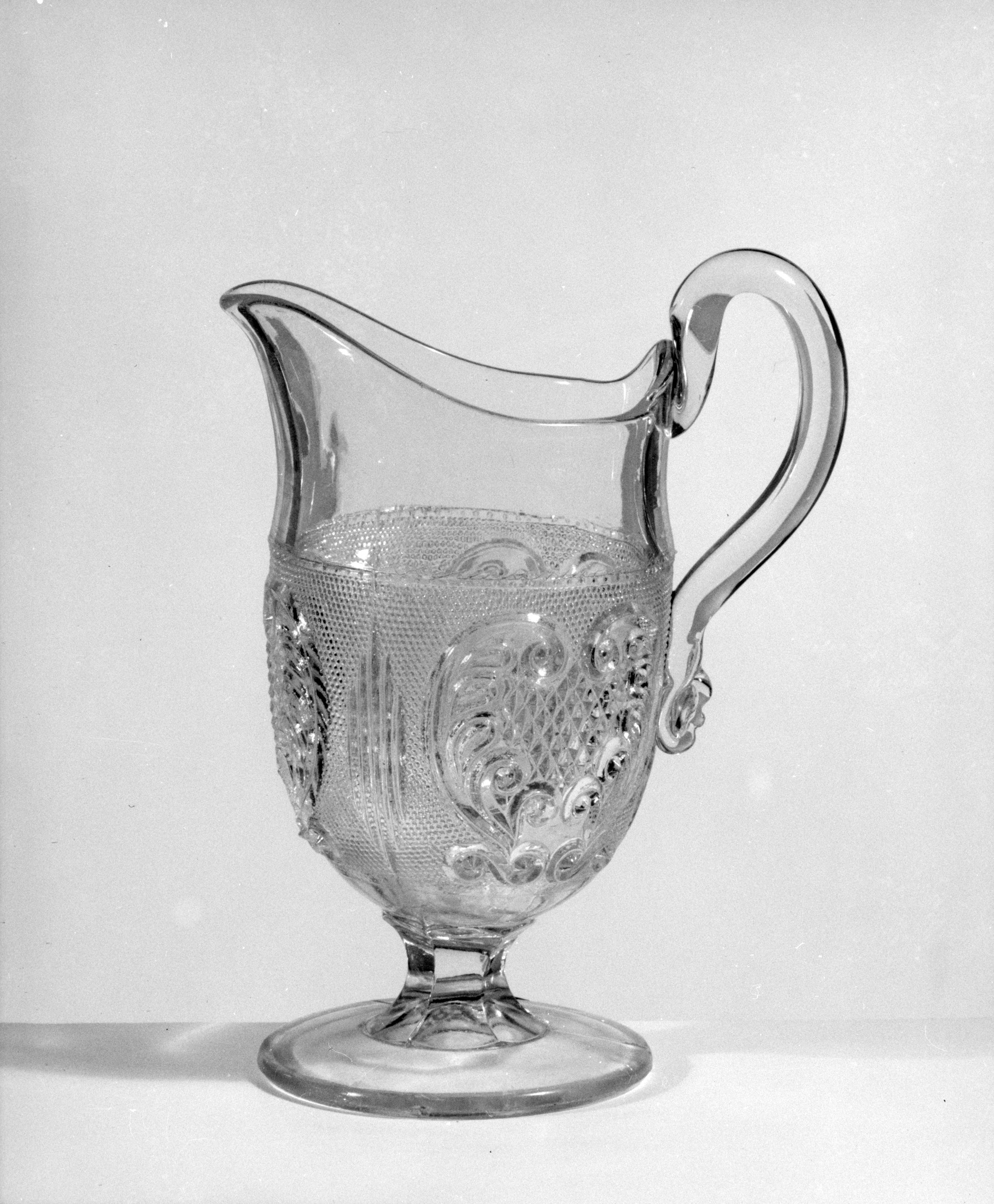
Detailed pressed glass by Bakewell, Pears & Co.

Bakewell came across a flint glasshouse (a building that makes glass, not to be confused with greenhouse) for sale in 1808. The founders of that glasshouse, George Robinson and Edward Ensell, were unable to keep the business afloat. Bakewell bought the property but employed Ensell as a glassblower. In the early days of the business, Benjamin Bakewell co-owned the glasshouse with his son Thomas and Benjamin Page. Bakewell had a variety of partners throughout the life of the company, but his longest-lasting partnership was with John P. Pears. The business was named Bakewell, Pears and Co.

Bakewell's company had to compete with the perfected art of English glass styles and foreign imports. Because Bakewell was born in England and worked as a merchant and importer of French goods before coming to America, he knew the European style. By 1809, he had hired skilled glassmakers, including Englishmen and Frenchmen, to better imitate English glass trends.

Although the company produced practical glasswork for tables, lamps, and apothecary equipment, it was renowned for its pressed/engraved patterns, especially the pieces they made for prominent public figures or presidents. Greyhounds were a popular Bakewell design along with other typical images like lovebirds. Bakewell and company was rivaled by Boston & Sandwich and the Northeast Glass Co but gained fame by being the first American company to make pieces of entirely cut glass. Cut glass is glass designed by a skilled hand and requires high-quality ingredients. Bakewell and Company also gained fame because it began producing the first successful American glassware containing lead oxide, known as lead crystal.

The title for who made the first pressed glassware in America was contested among John P. Bakewell, Enoch Robinson, and Henry Whitney. John P. Bakewell got a patent for "glass furniture (knobs)" in 1825, and in 1826, Robinson and Whitney got a patent for glass doorknobs. However, due to the Patent Office fire on December 17, 1836, there are no records to show whether or not those were the first patents in that type of glassware or if there were more patents on certain glass products. The same year John P. Bakewell patented glass knobs, he also developed the first glass-pressing machine for commercial use, resulting in reduced cost of pressed glass. The following year, Bakewell's company (still known as Bakewell, Page, & Bakewell) worked with Stourbridge Flint Glass Works to make glass affordable.

== Bakewell in the 19th century glass industry ==
Supposedly, glass production in America began in 1608 when eight Europeans from the London Company were sent to teach the colonists the glass making process. The Englishmen in Jamestown were the first to produce glass. Window glass, however, did not make an American appearance until about 1739. It would not be until the 1800s that Bakewell would enter the industry.

At first, the majority of glass pieces found by historians were attributed to Boston and Sandwich. It was later decided that the other glasshouses during that time had distributed a significant amount of glass that they had made with designs blatantly copied from Boston and Sandwich. Sandwich and the New England Glass Co were fierce competitors in distribution, and it would not be until years later that Bakewell's company would have a reputation.

The district glasshouses, like the New England Glass Co., Monogahela, Pittsburgh glasshouses, and others, were important in the growth of the country's glass industry because they experienced such growth. The glass industry grew rapidly from 10 glasshouses in 1800 to 33 glasshouses in 20 years. After 1880, glasshouses increased in size and began producing more variations in pieces using different techniques. The size growth of individual glasshouses cannot be said of all glasshouses. There were, of course, a number of glasshouses that did not last very long. The Saxon Sheet Glass Company in Boston, for example, only lasted six months in 1865. Technological advances take credit for the general uptake in the industry, such as advancements made in the furnaces used in the glassmaking process. This would result in a decrease in cost and time of production and subsequently an increase in consumption.

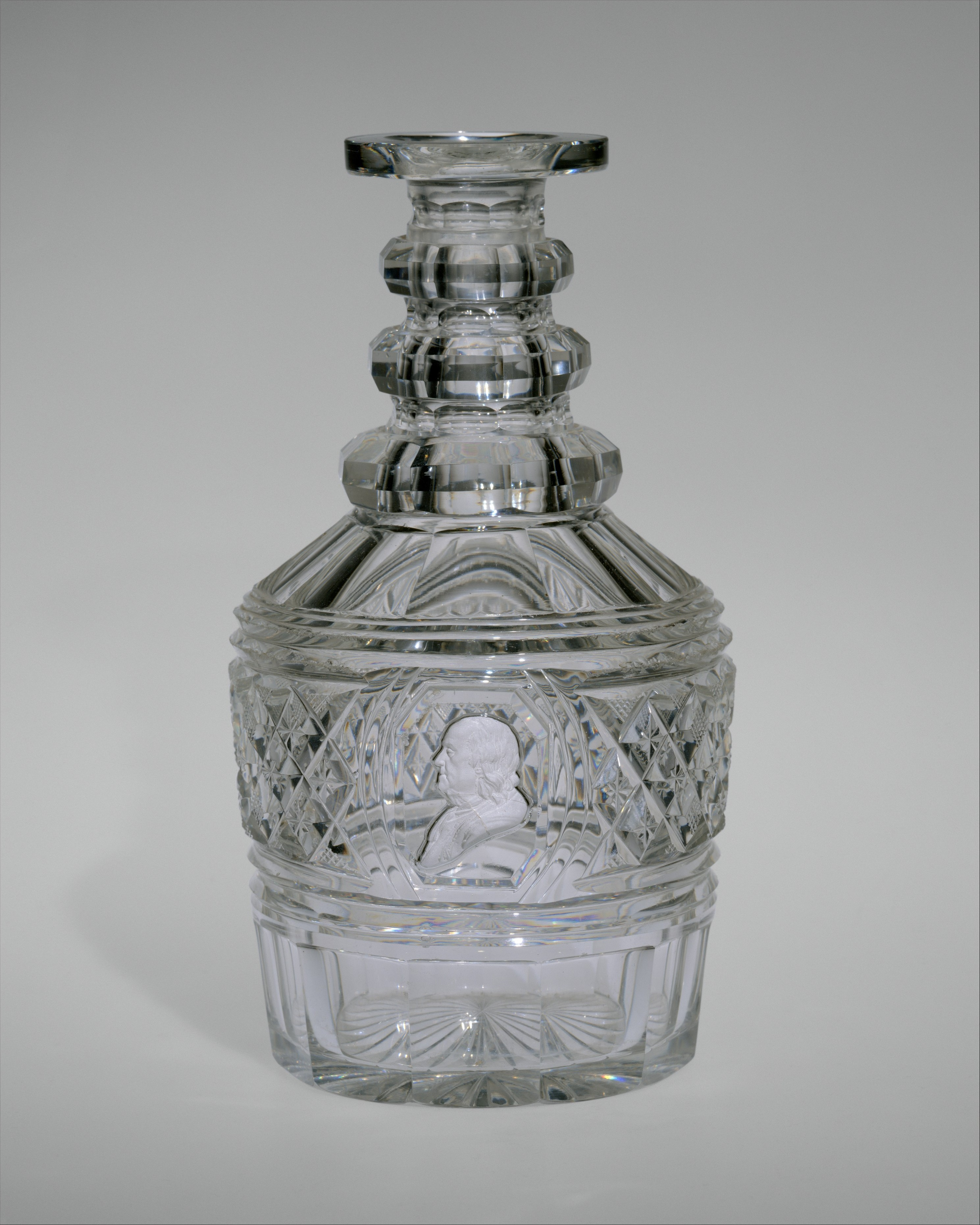
Clay cameo of Benjamin Franklin on blown and cut glass.

An embargo in 1807 that prevented imports of foreign glass, spurred on a high demand for domestic glass. Along with the advancements in technology, the glass industry was discovering useful natural resource deposits in America: clay beds found in New Jersey, Missouri and Pennsylvania meant another ingredient in certain glassmaking processes that was readily available. Pittsburgh—home of Bakewell's company—had great coal deposits.

Henry William Stiegel introduced the process of making lead glass to America in 1770, but the pieces resulting from that process were not consistent until Bakewell. Thus, Benjamin Bakewell became known as "the father of flint glass", or, more specifically, "the father of the flint-glass business in this [America] country". It was common for glass companies to rely heavily, if not entirely, on table and window glass, but 73 glasshouses reported to be making flint and lime glassware during the late 19th century. By then, flint glass was special not because it was rare but because of its ingredients. It required red lead and the purest obtainable forms of potash, sand, or lime.

== Bakewell products ==
Bakewell catered to the middle class through offering tableware and day-to-day pieces but also made a market for the upper class buyers through high quality and expensive pieces.

Bakewell & Co made portraits of Marquis de Lafayette, Andrew Jackson, Quincy Adams, and George Washington in tumblers. In 1816, two decanters were made for president Madison. The following year, President Monroe spent $1000 for glass to have in the White House. President Jackson made another purchase of glass for the White House in 1832 for $1500.

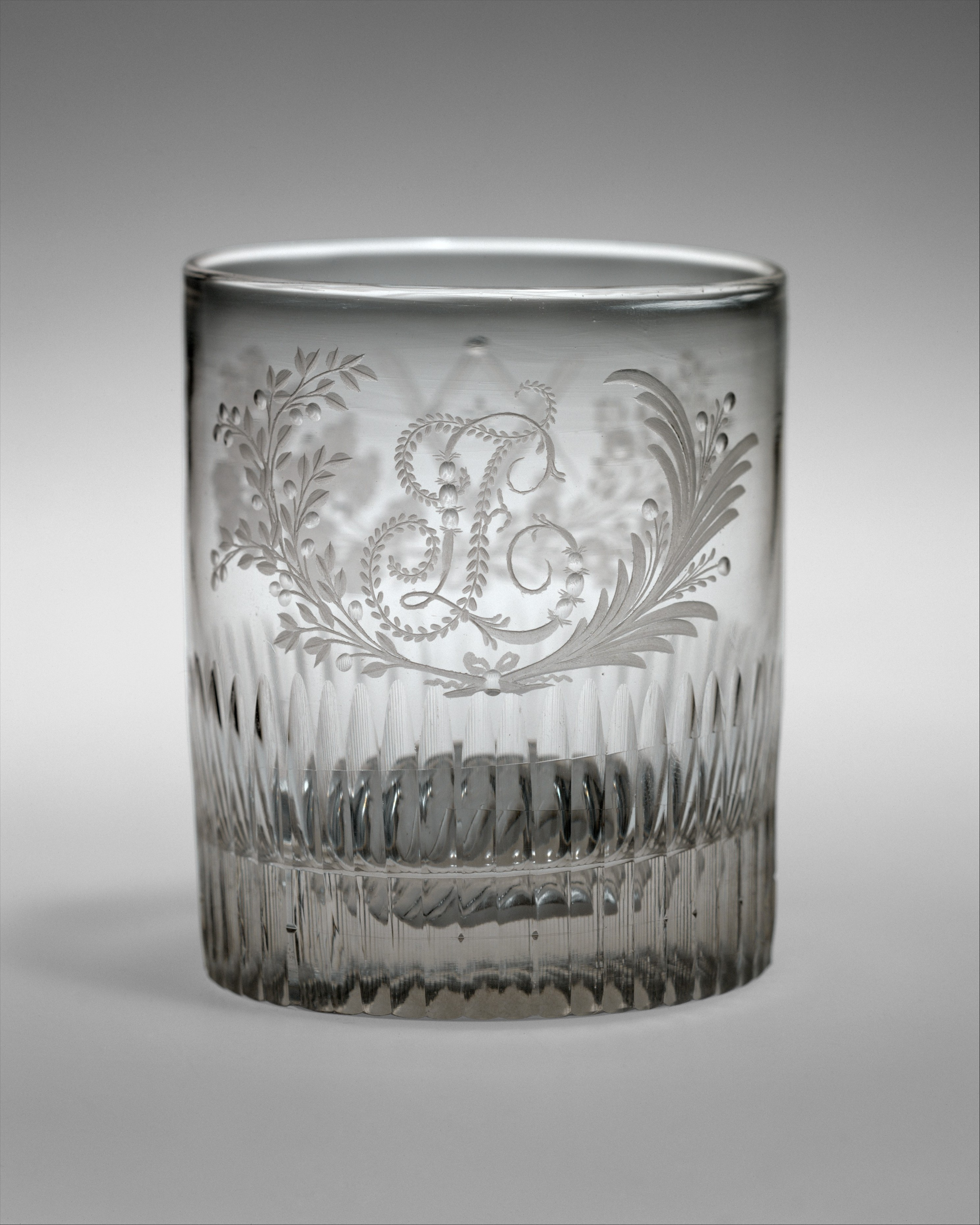
A cut and engraved tumbler by Bakewell, Pears & Co given to marquis de Lafayette. A cameo of Andrew Jackson is on the bottom (below).

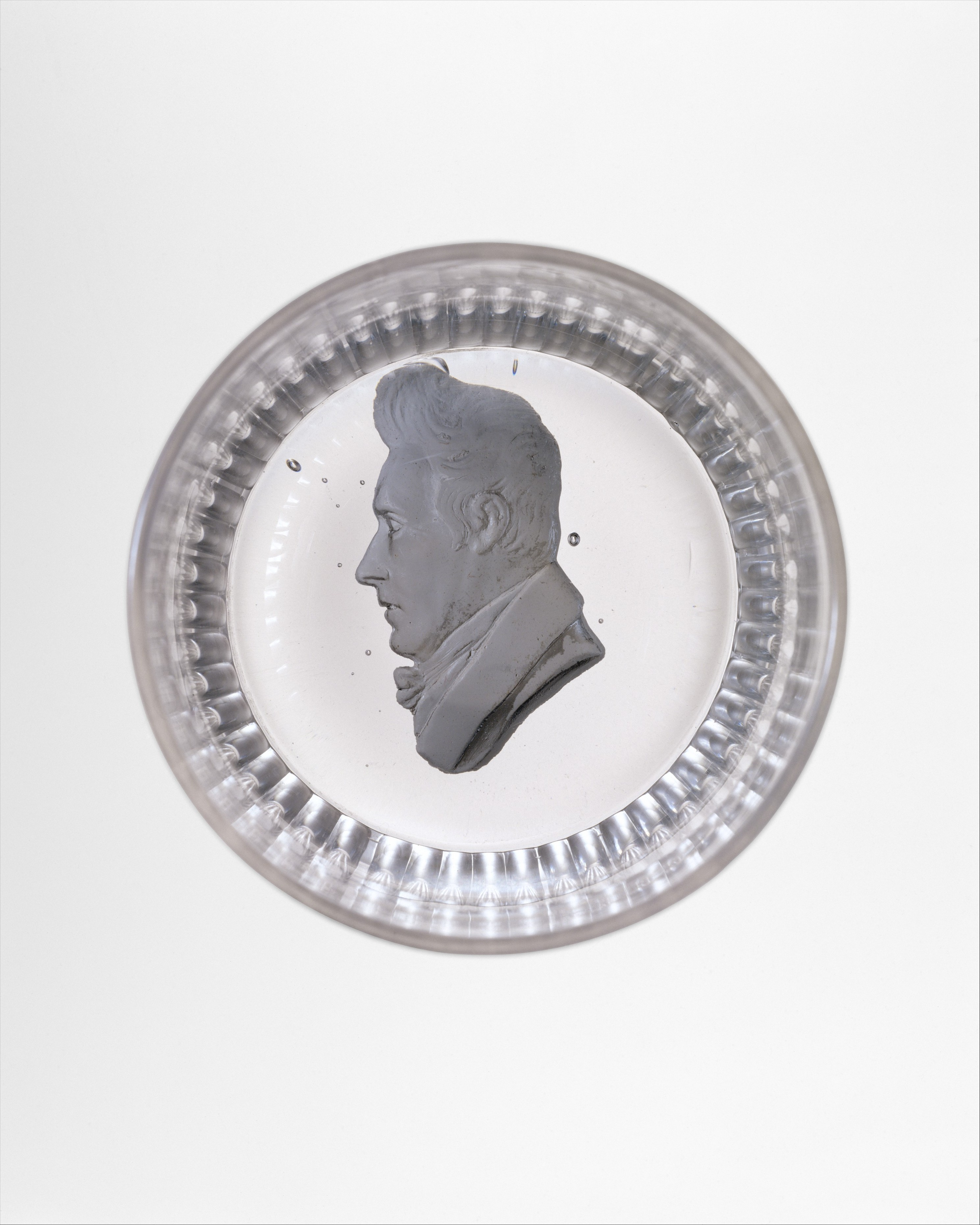
A sulphide portrait of Andrew Jackson on the bottom of the tumbler (above) given to marquis de Lafayette in 1825 made by Bakewell, Page & Co.

=== Sulfide portraits ===
Bakewell's employed glassworkers worked with engraving expensive sulfide portrait tumblers. These tumblers were bought by presidents, historical celebrities, and the wealthy and were considered to be valuable and exceptional pieces because of the quality in design and make of the glass. In 1827, portrait tumblers were 50¢ each. For reference, 50¢ in 1827 is approximately $12.67 in 2019.

An unknown Bohemian supposedly first discovered the idea of sulfide portraits by experimenting with the idea of relief images, also known as cameos, in glass. Josiah Wedgewood inadvertently inspired glass portraits in Europe because he made ceramic portrait medallions. Portraits were often an expensive affair. Portraits may have included ivory or rubies or other valuable materials. If one wanted a cheaper option, plaster or wax was often used. The ceramic portraits offered a more affordable and durable alternative. Sulfide portraits further developed in Europe.

Sulfide portraits were especially difficult to make because a glassblower would need to avoid letting any air bubbles exist between the glass and the ceramic substance. A hot ceramic piece was inserted into a bubble of glass. When the bubble bursts, the ceramic piece is enveloped by glass, and what is left is a silvery image of the relief. The name "sulphide portrait" was made when potters studying 19th century ceramics and glass were unaware of the process in making sulfide portraits and concluded that the silver-looking cameos were due to silver sulfide rather than a clay material.

== See also ==
- Glassmaking companies of the United States
