= St. Mary's Church, Castlemartin =

Church in Kilcullen, County Kildare, Ireland

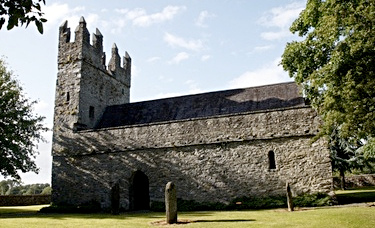
- St. Mary's Church today

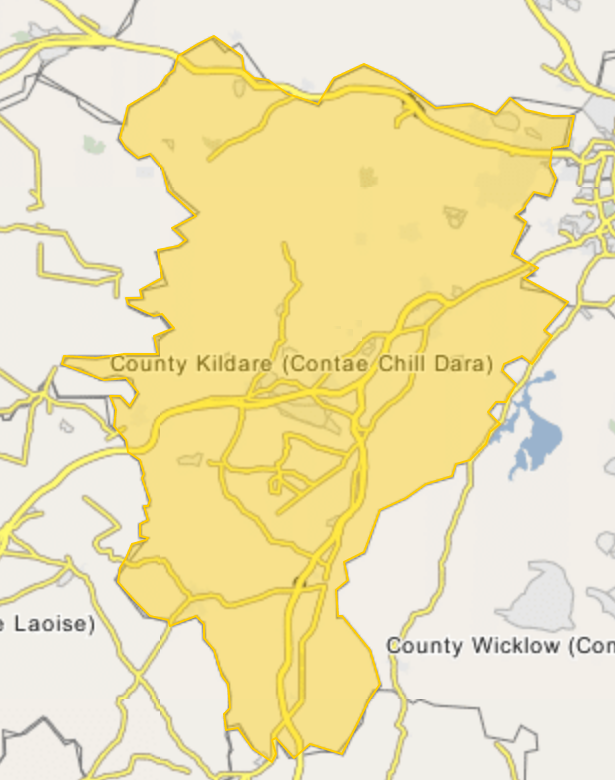
- Location within County Kildare
- 53°08′15″N 6°44′58″W
- Location: Kilcullen, County Kildare
- Country: Ireland
- Denomination: Roman Catholic

History
- Status: Active
- Founded: 1490
- Dedication: Mary, mother of Jesus

Architecture
- Functional status: Parish church

Administration
- Archdiocese: Dublin

St. Mary's Church, Castlemartin, located in the broad Kilcullen area of County Kildare, Ireland, is the first medieval church in Ireland to have been restored to full working order. The small stone Roman Catholic church, with accompanying burial ground, lies within Castlemartin Estate, which belonged for many years to media magnate Tony O'Reilly; O'Reilly paid for the restoration in 1979–1980, after which the church was reconsecrated in August 1981 by Archbishop Dermot Ryan. There has been a church on this site for over 800 years.

== History ==
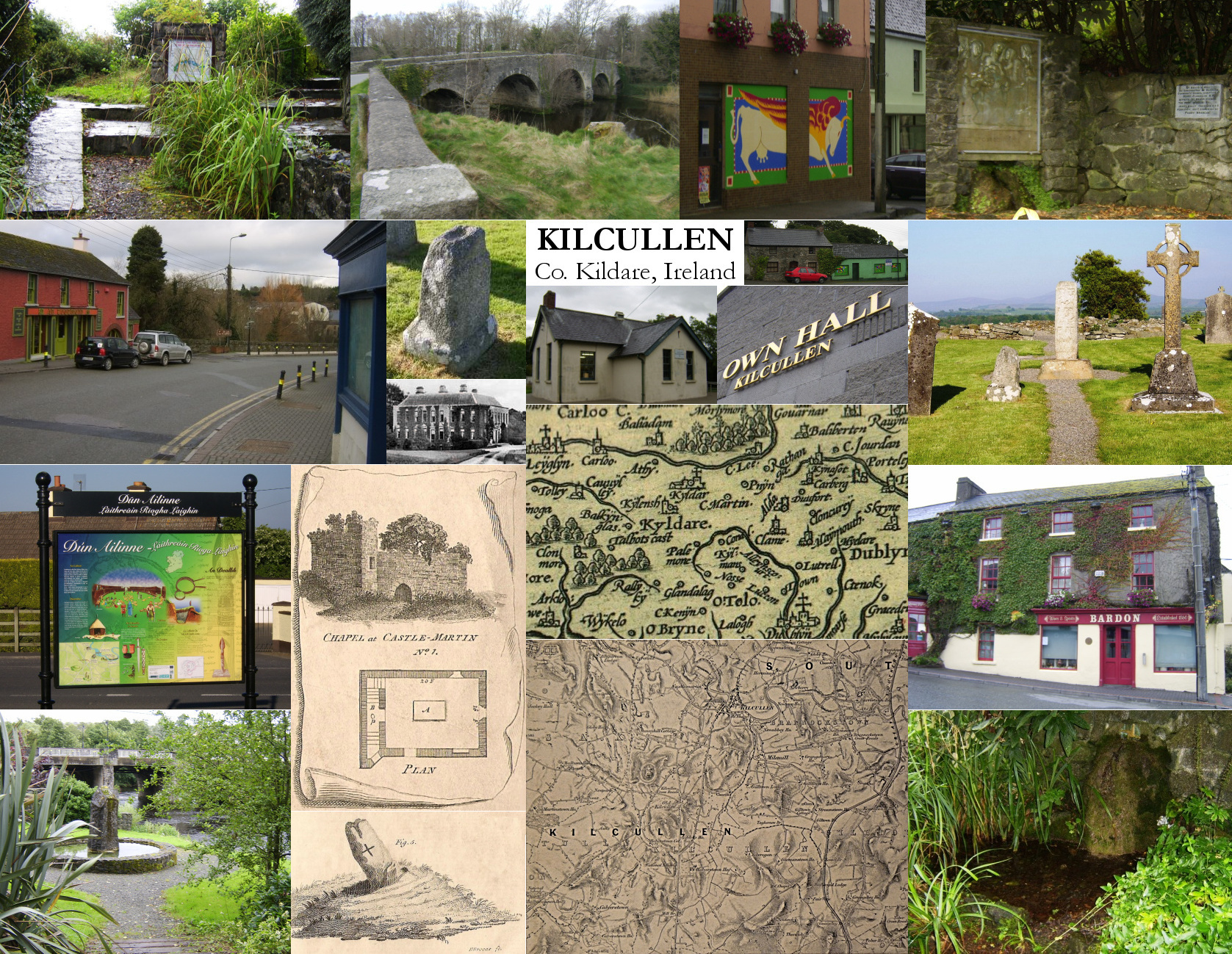
Historic sketch and floorplan of St. Mary's Church, Castlemartin, Kilcullen, from Anthologia Hibernica, 1793 (on a Kilcullen promotional postcard)

=== Accounts ===
Details of the church's history are limited but it is recorded in church documents and has been the subject of a number of articles – including by Major General Sir Eustace F. Tickell, Lord Walter Fitzgerald, James Norris Brewer, Meagher and a correspondent to Beauford's Anthologia Hibernica magazine (who also supplied drawings) – and of a booklet.

=== Origins ===
There is mention of a chapel at Castlemartin in a 1202 entry in the Calendar of Deeds of Christ Church Cathedral, Dublin, when Richard, Lord of Castlemartyn granted it to the cathedral. A later entry reaffirms the grant, along with 7 acres (28,000 m^{2}) of land.

The current church was constructed in the late 15th century, as place of worship for The 1st Baron Portlester and his family; Lord Portlester was appointed as Treasurer of Ireland in 1461, and Chancellor in 1472, and his daughter, Alison, married into the Fitzgerald family. Tony O'Reilly, based on research he commissioned, mentioned a possible construction date around 1490.

The chapel is mentioned in the Calendar of Christ Church Deeds for 1503, twice. The second entry notes that residents of two local areas pay two pence towards Kilcolyn (i.e. Kilcullen) Chapel, and a third penny towards Castlemartin Chapel. A further entry, in 1504, confirms to Holy Trinity Church (Christ Church Cathedral) property including "the Church of Killkolyn" "with the annexed chapel of St. Mary's, Castlemartin".

There is no information now as to the extent of the staffing of the church, its exact relationship (sometimes described as dependency) with the church at Kilcullen (or the preceding church at Old Kilcullen) or the scale of burial activity within or around it.

=== Decline ===
There is no record of when the church was abandoned, though it is believed to have been after 1700, and it was certainly ruined by 1793. For several centuries the church was roofless, and became overgrown. In 1862, Brewer, in his book "Beauties of Ireland" notes that the tomb within the church was overgrown and that fragments of monuments were scattered in the burial ground. Arms were concealed there undetected during the Irish War of Independence.

=== Restoration, 1979–1980 ===
In 1979, Tony O'Reilly decided to have the church restored, noting that he had often walked through the church field with his father and he engendered in me a great curiosity for the strange mosaic of Irish and Anglo Irish history and a compelling desire to know more about Castlemartin and the small Chapel that was a place of worship before the Reformation and had viewed silently the march and counter march of Irish history.

O'Reilly consulted with local authorities and engaged Percy Le Clerc, an experienced former senior official with The Office of Public Works (The O.P.W.), as architect. Le Clerc studied the church structure, and such limited historical material as was available, including the 18th century magazine article from which the sketches on the postcard above come, and concluded that the building had probably existed in three main states during its history, notably with differences in the upper parts, where there is an external walkway. It was decided to restore it to the middle state.

Planning permission was granted, subject to reasonable public access to the restored building being made available, and the restoration began on 17 August 1979. No significant excavation or other exploratory work was demanded or conducted, and most restoration work was completed by December 1980. The church was then furnished simply and modern electrical circuits installed.

=== Reconsecration ===
As it was unclear what the ecclesiastical status of the church had been over the years of neglect, it was arranged for it to be reconsecrated. In parallel, Tony and Susan O'Reilly arranged for an illustrated booklet to be published, summarising the history of the church, its restoration and aspects of its interior.

The Mass of Reconsecration was conducted on 16 August 1981, led by The Most Rev. Dr. Dermot Ryan, Lord Archbishop of Dublin, who emphasised the historic nature of such an event. Invitees included family, friends and locals, with Tony O'Reilly's mother as guest of honour and hymn selector, music by Caroline O'Reilly and John Grogan, prayers by Tony O'Reilly, Junior, and readings by Cameron O'Reilly and Tony O'Reilly's friend, rugby player Peter Kininmonth. Holy water, incense and chrism oil were used, and a chalice from the 1932 Eucharistic Congress Mass in Dublin. A silver chalice from 1643 was presented to the owner for use in subsequent Masses.

=== Since 1981 ===
The church has hosted Mass on a number of occasions, as well as family weddings, such as those of Susan Cameron to Tarik Wildman (before an Episcopal Dean) and of Gavin O'Reilly to Alison Doody, and at least one funeral, that of Tony O'Reilly's mother, Alison. It was also intended to have chamber music and other public events there.

Tony O'Reilly's parents are buried alongside the church, his father having been moved there from Glasnevin Cemetery, and he has stated that this will be his final resting place also.

== Location ==
The church is located in a field at the top of the banks of the River Liffey, within the Castlemartin Estate. It is some distance north east of Castlemartin House and the estate farm buildings, reachable along a tree-lined avenue, and is adjoined by a small burial ground. The building is surrounded by a narrow strip of gravel, and flat paving. The church field is bounded on several sides by trees, and with a further field between it and the river, is not readily visible, nor is there a ready path for public access.

== Structure ==
The building has a simple floorplan, with a basic nave overlooked by a small gallery, and a footprint (internal measurement) of 42 feet (13 m) x 16.5 feet. There is some complexity with the stair and roof areas, and it is in regard to these that the states of the building primarily differed.

According to Le Clerc, the three phases of building were as follows:

- Initially, a stairway within the western wall went up from the church, passing the door to the gallery and opening onto a walk along the southern wall, with steps across the eastern gable and another open wall-walk across the western front at a slightly raised level, with a simple bell-turret for two bells on the western gable.
- Within a short span of years, he determined that twin west towers (one containing a stair) were built on top of the earlier work at the western end of the church without altering it
- Later, perhaps around 1550, a two-part dormer window was built over the wall-walk on the northern side of the western gallery, breaking the circulation around the roof of the church, limiting access to the towers.

LeClerc further commented that the church had been poorly constructed, using low-quality limestone and little mortar, and might have collapsed in the 19th century had it not been buttressed by Major Blacker.

Taking into account the attraction of the twin towers, and the complication of the roof walk introduced by the third phase of work, the building was restored to the second identified state.

=== Tomb ===
An effigial tomb was located centrally in the church, badly broken, the only visible monument remaining inside. This was also restored, as far as possible, during the work of 1979–1980, and relocated to a place under the gallery at the back of the church. The tomb, which features a damaged figure of a knight, may have been made for Richard, son of Sir Roland FitzEustace, Baron Portlester and Lord of Castlemartin or for Thomas, Lord of Castlemartin. Under the tomb was a vault in which eleven skeletons were found, and this remains in situ.

=== Furnishings ===
There is no record as to how the building was furnished but new furniture was made based on what is known about churches of the 15th and 16th centuries in Ireland. The primary material for furnishings was unseasoned oak, fixed with oak pegs, without any metal parts used at all.

== Sources ==
- Kilcullen, Co. Kildare, 1981, edited (and history section) by Sean Landers, foreword by Tony O'Reilly, with Percy Le Clerc and Helen M. Roe: The restoration of the Church of St. Mary, Castlemartin, Co. Kildare (published privately to mark its reconsecration, supervised by Murray Consultants) – photocopies of parts accessed.
- Kildare, Ireland, 1955: Journal of the County Kildare Archaeological Society, Volume XI1I, No. 6, Tickell, Major-General Sir-Eustace: "The Eustace Family & Their Lands in County Kildare" (parts of).
- London, UK, 1962; The Ebury Press; Lord Killanin, M. V. Duignan: "The Shell Guide to Ireland"
