= Cameron O'Reilly =

Irish businessman (born 1964)

- Born: Anthony Cameron O'Reilly; 28 April 1964 (age 62); Dublin, Ireland
- Occupation: Businessman
- Spouses: Ilse O'Reilly (m. 2002; div. 2022) Jemima Goldsmith (m. 2026)
- Children: 4
- Father: Tony O'Reilly

Anthony Cameron O'Reilly (born 28 April 1964) is a Dublin-born businessman with Irish and Australian citizenship, and the son of media magnate Tony O'Reilly. Having managed one of Australia's largest press groups, he is currently managing director of Bayard Group, which includes the world's largest electricity metering supplier, and has revenues of over US$1.2 billion.

== Life ==
=== Early life ===
The son of an Irish father, media magnate Tony O'Reilly and an Australian mother, Susan Cameron, O'Reilly was brought up in Dublin and Kilcullen in Ireland until age five, then in London, England, for a couple of years, then in the U.S. at Fox Chapel, Pittsburgh until age 14. He has two brothers, Gavin O'Reilly and Tony O'Reilly, Junior, and businesswoman Chryss Goulandris is his step-mother. He finished school at Clongowes Wood, a Jesuit school near the main family home, Castlemartin, County Kildare, both historically owned by the same family.

He took his Irish Leaving Certificate in 1983, then attended Worcester College, Oxford, graduating with an honours degree in Politics, Philosophy and Economics, having represented the university in tennis, rugby and punting, and having led a motorcycle expedition from Oxford to China. He also represented Oxford in debating and was treasurer of the Oxford Union.

=== Early career ===
O'Reilly worked for the investment bank Goldman Sachs from the mid-1980s to 1988. He then returned to Ireland to work for a few months at Independent News & Media, the public company led by his father, before being moved to Australia to a sales role on the regional side of APN News & Media, in which the O'Reilly family (via a trust) and Independent had invested. He was also appointed to the APN board of directors. APN at that time was already a major Australian press group, leading in local newspapers. After working in sales from 1988 to 1991, he was appointed general manager of the Rockhampton Morning Bulletin from 1991 to 1992, then deputy CEO of APN.

In 1992, he met his wife-to-be, Ilse, on a blind date, and they became engaged three weeks later. He noted that one newspaper commented that he might spend more time on APN and less in nightclubs after this.

In May 1996, O'Reilly was appointed CEO of APN, and directed a programme of acquisition and development over several years, increasing interests in radio and other channels, while approaching the internet area cautiously. He became involved in the work of a number of charitable organisations, some with his wife, Ilse (who also has her own charitable interests, including a refuge for women), and became a life governor of the Australian Ireland Fund. In October 1999, O'Reilly announced that he would leave his executive role at APN to pursue private business interests, and he did so in July 2000, moving to Grenoble in France. He remains a non-executive director of APN and was a director of Independent News and Media until early 2009. He is also a director of IRESS Market Technology.

=== Later career ===
In 2002, O'Reilly returned to Australia, where he received the Governor Peace Award in November. He also became a director of Gazal Corporation Limited (2002–2005), one of Australia's drapers.

In May 2003, he launched investment house Bayard Capital, with 100 million Australian dollars from various shareholders, including John Fairfax and the government of Singapore. He himself sold two-thirds of his APN shares in early 2004 to invest in Bayard, which spent over US$200 million on acquisitions in its first year, finishing that year with 3500 employees in 27 countries and annual sales of over US$600 million.

O'Reilly developed Bayard with a focus on investments that leveraged growing shortages of energy and water, including metering technology, and by 2008, the Bayard group of companies employed over 5000 people across 30 countries, with a turnover in excess of US$1.2 billion and EBITDA earnings in excess of US$200 million. One of its major holdings was Landis + Gyr, the world's largest electrical metering company, and the entire group was renamed to Landis+Gyr in early 2008.

In June 2008, O'Reilly received the International Irish Business Person of the Year Award from Dublin-based Business & Finance magazine, having in May spoken about his company's plans to partially float.

In July 2008, O'Reilly announced a five-year refinancing of the company's borrowings and credit lines, totalling US$1.1 billion, and plans to float by 2010, with an equity value in excess of US$2 billion. He noted that his shareholding would be around 7% by then, including share options. His father also owns around 7%. The flotation would probably take place in New York, where the company formally opened a new office on 18 July 2008.

In May 2011, it was announced that O'Reilly had sold Landis+Gyr to Toshiba Corporation of Japan for $2.3 billion. The sale was closed on 29 July 2011. Following the sale, O'Reilly returned as CEO of Bayard Capital AG

=== Personal life ===
O'Reilly and his former wife Ilse O'Reilly have four children. The couple were married from 2002 to 2022. In September 2026, O'Reilly married Jemima Goldsmith.

O'Reilly has resided in Zug, Switzerland, since 2010, the home of Landis+Gyr and now Bayard Capital AG. His hobbies include hiking and ski touring.

O'Reilly is reportedly a major donor to the Australian Republic Movement, having donated $250,000 in 2015 and $125,000 in 2022.

== Sources ==
- Dublin, Ireland, 31 October 2004: The Sunday Business Post, "The Son That Got Away", Gavin Daly.
- Sydney, Australia, 12 August 2003: The Sydney Morning Herald, "O'Reilly clocks up first asset for Bayard", Ian Porter
- Dublin, Ireland, Friday 18 July 2008: The Irish Times, Business, The Friday Interview: "Measuring up Cameron O'Reilly, Landis+Gyr"
