= Tony O'Reilly =

Irish businessman and rugby union player (1936–2024)

Sir Tony O'Reilly AO
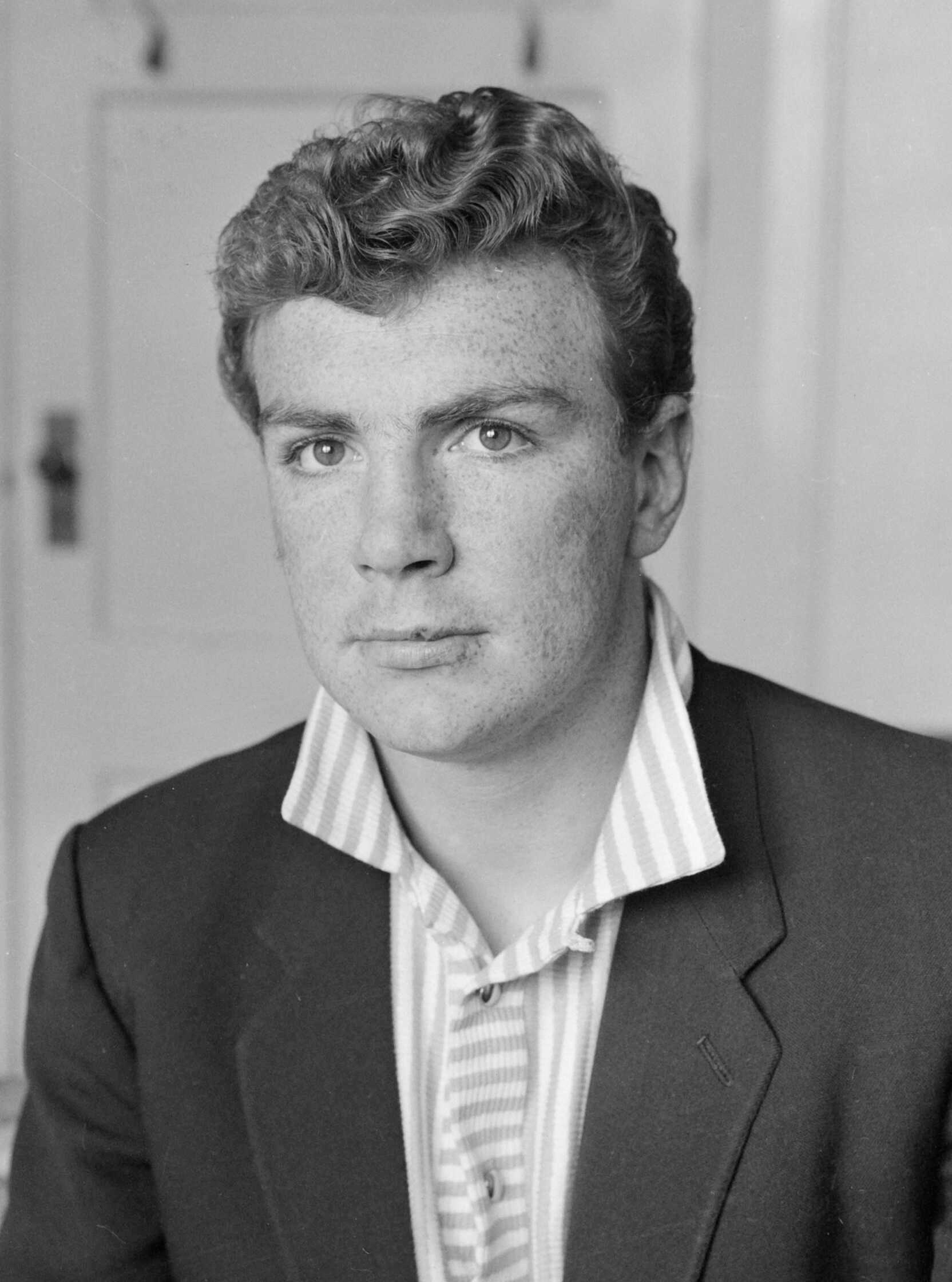
- O'Reilly in New Zealand in 1959
- Born: Anthony John Francis O'Reilly; 7 May 1936 Dublin, Ireland
- Died: 18 May 2024 (aged 88) Dublin, Ireland
- School: Belvedere College
- University: University College Dublin; University of Bradford

Rugby union career
- Position: Wing
Senior career
Years	Team	Apps	(Points)
- Old Belvedere
1958–1960	Leicester Tigers	17	(24)
- London Irish
Provincial / State sides
Years	Team	Apps	(Points)
- Leinster
International career
Years	Team	Apps	(Points)
1955–1970	Ireland	29	(12)
1955, 1959	British Lions	10	(18)
1955–1963	Barbarians	30	(114)
Association football career
Youth career
- Years: Team
- Home Farm

Sir Anthony John (Note: Some sources give Joseph as his second forename.) Francis O'Reilly (7 May 1936 – 18 May 2024) was an Irish businessman and international rugby union player. He was known for his try scoring in rugby, his involvement in the Independent News & Media Group, which he led from 1973 to 2009, and as CEO and chairman of the H.J. Heinz Company. He was the leading shareholder of Waterford Wedgwood and a founder and major supporter of The Ireland Funds. A citizen of both Ireland and the United Kingdom, he was knighted as a Knight Bachelor for his services to Northern Ireland.

As a rugby player, he represented Ireland, the British and Irish Lions and the Barbarians and is enshrined as a member of the International Rugby Board's Hall of Fame. In business, he was noted for multiple successful roles, and became a billionaire, but by 2014, was being pursued in the Irish courts for debts amounting to €22 million by AIB, following losses amounting to hundreds of millions of euros in his unsuccessful attempt to save the Waterford Wedgwood group and to stop Denis O'Brien from assuming control of Independent News & Media.

O'Reilly had six children from his first marriage, and 23 grandchildren, and was later married to Greek shipping heiress Chryss Goulandris, who died in 2023. He lived in Lyford Cay in the Bahamas until 2017, when the property was sold for less than €12 million as part of a bankruptcy arrangement. O'Reilly later lived in Château des Ducs de Normandie in Bonneville-sur-Touques in France and in County Kildare, Ireland. He died, after a short illness, at a hospital in Dublin on 18 May 2024, at the age of 88.

== Early years ==
=== Background ===
O'Reilly was born in Dublin and was the only child of a civil servant, John O'Reilly (1906–1976), and Aileen O'Connor (1914–1989). O'Reilly's Drogheda-born father, eventually an inspector-general of customs, was born "Reilly" and added the O' when he applied to join the Irish Civil Service. Previously married with four older children, but estranged from his first wife, John O'Reilly married Aileen O'Connor in 1973, after the death of his first wife and only a little time after he had told his son of his other family. O'Reilly had been told about the situation by a Jesuit when he was 15, but kept it secret. He arranged for the John and Aileen O'Reilly Library at Dublin City University to be named after his parents, and O'Reilly Hall at University College Dublin to be named after his father, who had studied there.

O'Reilly, named "Tony" after his mother's favourite brother, grew up on Griffith Avenue, a broad middle-class street in the Drumcondra/Glasnevin area of Dublin. He had prominent red hair. He holidayed with family, including an aunt in Balbriggan, cousins in Sligo and others in Drogheda. In 1951, the family moved to a bungalow in Santry.

=== Education ===
Educated at Belvedere College from the age of six, O'Reilly participated in several sports, including association football, cricket, tennis, and rugby union. As a youth, he played football for Home Farm. In cricket he was a member of the Junior Cup-winning team in 1950; in tennis, he was in a Leinster Schools Cup-winning team and reached the under-15 national semi-finals. He was also noted for his acting skills (and participated in Gilbert and Sullivan operettas such as Iolanthe, and Dunsany's A Night at an Inn). He was an altar boy, and a regular attendee at chapel, and during his time there spent a summer in the Gaeltacht to improve his Irish language skills. He passed the Leaving Certificate at 17, and with four schoolmates, studied philosophy, still at Belvedere, for a year after this, while developing his rugby. He was a prefect for his last two years at the school, and a senior member of a key sodality.

O'Reilly went on to study law at University College Dublin and then at the Incorporated Law Society of Ireland. He came fifth in Ireland in intermediate exams in 1956, and first and third in the country in final examinations in 1958, and was enrolled as a solicitor in November 1958. He never practised after training, but later became chairman of the major Dublin solicitors' firm now known as Matheson.

O'Reilly earned a PhD in agricultural marketing from the University of Bradford, and in addition, held at least one honorary doctorate.

== Rugby Union career ==
=== Ireland ===
Between 1955 and 1970 O'Reilly won 29 caps for Ireland. His Five Nations career of 15 years, 23 days is the longest in history, a record shared with fellow Ireland player Mike Gibson. He made his senior international debut, aged just 18, against France on 22 January 1955. He scored his four tries for Ireland against France on 28 January 1956; against Scotland on 25 February 1956; against Wales in 1959; and against France in 1963. He made his final appearance for Ireland on 14 February 1970, after a six-year absence from the national team, against England. This final appearance was an 11th-hour replacement, denying Frank O'Driscoll — father of Brian, Ireland's most-capped player—what would prove to be his only chance at a Test cap.

=== British and Irish Lions ===
O'Reilly toured twice with the British Lions, on their 1955 tour to South Africa and their 1959 tour to Australia and New Zealand. He made his debut for the Lions on 26 June 1955, scoring two tries against a Northern Universities XV. He played 15 games during the 1955 tour, scoring 16 tries. This included hat-tricks against a North Eastern Districts XV on 20 July and Transvaal on 23 July. He also played in all four Tests against South Africa, making his Test debut on the right wing before a crowd of 95,000 at Ellis Park on 6 August. He scored a try in the Lions 23–22 victory. He scored another try in the fourth Test on 24 September.

On the 1959 tour, he played a further 23 games and scored 22 tries. This included a hat-trick against King Country/Counties on 19 August. He played in all six tests, two against Australia and four against New Zealand. He scored tries in the two test wins against Australia and in the first and fourth tests against New Zealand. His total of 38 tries for the Lions on two tours remains a record.

=== Barbarians ===
Between 1955 and 1963, O'Reilly also made 30 appearances and scored 38 tries for the Barbarians. He made his debut on 9 April 1955 in a 6–3 win against Cardiff, and his final appearance against Swansea on 15 April 1963. On the Barbarians' 1958 tour of South Africa, O'Reilly scored 12 tries, seven of them in the game against East Africa. He remains the Barbarians record holder for both appearances and tries.

=== Later rugby involvement ===
O'Reilly was a member of the IRFU Commercial Committee. He was in the first class of inductees into the International Rugby Hall of Fame in 1997, and was inducted into the IRB Hall of Fame in 2009.

== Business career ==
O'Reilly went from college to work as a management consultant for Weston-Evans in Ashby-de-la-Zouch, Leicestershire; he earned £200 annually, which was a very good salary by the then Irish standards. While there, he continued his rugby career, with Leicester. His work included cost accounting and time-and-motion studies, in industries ranging from shoe-making to pottery.

He then moved to Sutton's of Cork, selling agricultural products, coal and oil.

=== Irish semi-state sector ===
O'Reilly joined An Bord Bainne, the Irish Dairy Board, in 1962, as General Manager, and developed the successful Kerrygold "umbrella brand" for Irish export butter. In 1966 he became Managing Director of the Irish Sugar Company. He soon developed a joint venture for freeze-drying food with the H. J. Heinz Co.

=== Heinz ===
In 1969, after discussions with the then Taoiseach Jack Lynch, who offered him a post such as Minister for Agriculture if he would stay, O'Reilly joined Heinz. There he made his name in international business, becoming managing director of the Heinz subsidiary in the UK, its largest non-US holding and the source of half of the group's profit.

He moved to the company HQ in Pittsburgh in 1971 when he was promoted to senior vice-president for the North America and Pacific region. In 1973, R. Burt Gookin and Jack Heinz made him COO and President. He became CEO in 1979 when Mr. Gookin, then vice-chairman and chief executive officer, retired.

He became chairman of Heinz in 1987, succeeding HJ Heinz II, and becoming the first non-Heinz family member to hold that post. His guidance was seen as having helped transform the company into a major international competitor, its value increasing twelvefold (from $908 million to $11 billion). O'Reilly left Heinz in 1998 after several years during which analysts questioned the company's performance, and after challenges from corporate governance groups and major pension funds including CalPERS and Business Week magazine; he was succeeded by his deputy, William R. Johnson.

=== Other business interests ===
During his time at Heinz, O'Reilly held roles as a major shareholder and chairman of several companies, including Waterford Wedgwood (1995–2009) and Independent News & Media, and of a major partnership of solicitors, Matheson, in Dublin. Provision for him to do this was written into his contract before he went to the United States. After he left Heinz, he focused on three of these: Independent News & Media; Waterford Wedgwood; and Fitzwilton; and later, for a brief time, Eircom. He was the main shareholder in Arcon, the Irish base-metal mining company that developed the Galmoy lead-zinc deposit, the company being co-founded with Richard Conroy, and later sold to Lundin Mining in 2005. He also retained a 40% stake in Providence Resources Plc, the Irish-based oil and gas exploration and development company.

=== Independent News & Media ===
O'Reilly bought into Independent News & Media (INM), a Dublin-based print media company, in 1973, and at peak, held over 28% of its shares, with leverage over more than 29.5% with family and other connected parties. He pushed the company to expand into other national markets and to increase its reach in Ireland. In the 1990s INM bought into South Africa (from 1994), Australia (from 1988) and New Zealand (from 1995), acquiring 38 newspaper titles, over 70 radio stations, cable and telecoms interests at a cost of around €1.3 billion. In the United Kingdom, INM took control of the national broadsheet The Independent in 1995, edging out MGN and Prisa. The company had over 200 national and regional newspaper and magazine titles in total, revenues of €1.7 billion and profits of €110.7 million, and assets of around €4.7 billion as well as debts in the region of €1.3 billion.

On Friday 13 March 2009, it was announced that on O'Reilly's 73rd birthday, 7 May, he would resign as both CEO and a member of the board of INM, to be succeeded by his son, Gavin. Further, the often-criticised large size of the board would be reduced from 17 to 10 and would include three nominees of Denis O'Brien. These announcements were actioned, and O'Reilly became President Emeritus of the group. The markets reacted positively to the news, especially to the explicit truce between the O'Reilly and O'Brien shareholder blocs, with Denis O'Brien voicing public support for Gavin O'Reilly as CEO-designate. The O'Reilly shareholding was diluted sharply from 2009.

=== Interests beyond INM ===
Among other investments, O'Reilly had at various times interests in:

- Fitzwilton, an industrial holding and investment company established with friends (Ferguson and Leonard) in the early 1970s. Over the years, the company was involved in numerous business activities including textiles, house construction, fertiliser manufacturing, bottling, oil and gas investments, supermarkets and light manufacturing. Taken private in the late 1990s in conjunction with his brother-in-law, the company was later involved in light manufacturing, property investments, financial services and architectural signage.
- Waterford Wedgwood Plc, the majority of which was placed in administration on 5 January 2009, and of which he was chairman until that date
- Providence Resources Plc, an Irish-based oil and gas exploration and production company, in which he held a stake of at least 40%. The company has interests in Ireland, the UK, the US and Nigeria.
- Landis+Gyr, one of the world's largest smart metering companies, in which he held a 7% stake prior to its sale to Toshiba

=== Lockwood and E-mat ===
In 1996, in conjunction with his brother-in-law Petros Goulandris, he along with CEO Leonard Reinhart backed a management team that created Lockwood Financial Partners, which was named after friend Jim Lockwood who was a colleague and fee-based pioneer, and its sister company E-MAT (EMAT) which was founded by Leonard Reinhart and Jay N. Whipple to provide the first common operating program for separately managed accounts (SMAs). EMAT and the wealth management firm Lockwood, which was originally formed as Lockwood Advisors in 1995, based in Malvern, Pennsylvania, specialised in providing independent financial investment advisory services to brokers of high-net-worth individuals, and went on to become one of the largest independent advisory companies in the United States before both firms were sold to the Bank of New York (BoNY) in 2002, while Gerald L Hassell was president of BoNY, that folded Lockwood and Pershing LLC into the BNY Securities Group under the Pershing umbrella in October 2003 with Joseph M. Velli heading the BoNY Securities Group which would allow BoNY to compete against U.S. Trust, J.P. Morgan Chase, as well as those more brokerage-oriented organizations for private banking clients. Prior to the acquisition of Lockwood and EMAT by BoNY, RBC Dominion Securities was the two firms' primary institutional advisory account. At the time, assets under management were estimated to be in excess of $11 billion.

=== Eircom and Valentia ===
O'Reilly was part of the Valentia consortium that bought into Eircom, the former Irish state phone company, in November 2001, for €2.8 billion, beating a rival offer of €3 billion. In 2004, the company was partly refloated, and in 2005 sold at a profit to Babcock & Brown of Australia.

== Charitable works ==
O'Reilly sponsored and supported a wide range of charitable activities. Several of these, such as the many-year support of a professorship in Australian Studies at UCD, were arranged together with his first wife, and likewise later, he and his second wife would often jointly support an activity, such as sponsorship of a gallery at the National Science Historical Museum adjacent to Birr Castle. He showed a particular interest in naming rights, where a contribution to a project, generally of 5% to 20%, allows a donor to add a name to the project, and has received at least one such "name" as a gift.

=== Kilcullen ===
O'Reilly supported a number of local initiatives, from floral street displays and signage for local nature walks in Kilcullen to commissioning, with his wife, a piece of music for the launch of the Dun Ailinne Interpretative Park. A presentation in recognition of this was made in mid-2009. O'Reilly was also the patron of the Kilcullen GAA club.

=== The O'Reilly Foundation ===
The O'Reilly Foundation is a charity set up by O'Reilly with a board of trustees composed of family members, long chaired by his second wife, and with a scholarship board headed by Professor Emeritus John Kelly of UCD, succeeding Ken Whitaker. With an office address at a family home in Dublin, and an executive secretary, it contributed to various projects, with an emphasis on the education sector, primarily running an annual scholarship programme, awarding 2–3 advanced, usually multi-year, third-level scholarships, each for over €20,000 per annum.

Both through the foundation and before its inception, O'Reilly contributed to a range of university projects in Ireland, including examples at Dublin City University, University College Dublin, Trinity College Dublin and Queen's University Belfast.

O'Reilly also paid for the construction of the 600-seat O'Reilly Theatre in Belvedere College, and also funded projects in the college. The family also contributed to the construction of the O'Reilly Theater in Pittsburgh, Pennsylvania, and the 181 seat O'Reilly Theatre at Keble College, Oxford.

=== Trinity College Dublin ===
O'Reilly contributed towards the O'Reilly Institute, backed the development of Jewish Studies within TCD, and supported the Chair in Neuroscience. He was a Pro-Chancellor of the University of Dublin from 1994 until retiring on age grounds at the end of the 2010/2011 academic year, and was also a member of the board of the Trinity Foundation.

=== University College Dublin ===
O'Reilly supported his alma mater, UCD, by funding the O'Reilly Hall, named in honour of his parents. This building is used primarily for graduation ceremonies

=== Dublin City University ===
The John and Aileen O'Reilly Library at Dublin City University was named in honour of his parents, as the O'Reilly Foundation contributed a substantial sum to the library's capital costs in 2000.

=== Queen's University Belfast ===
A new library at Queen's University of Belfast was, as of 2008, to be named the Sir Anthony O'Reilly Library, in recognition of support for the University, including a pledge of £4 million (of a £44 million cost for the library), £2 million from his personal charity, The O'Reilly Foundation and £2 million from Independent News and Media / The Belfast Telegraph and the Ireland Funds. However, following a request by O'Reilly in April 2009, the library was proposed to be known as either "The New Library" or "The Library at Queen's".

=== The Ireland Funds ===
The American Ireland Fund, the central entity in The Ireland Funds, was established in Boston by O'Reilly and his friend, Pittsburgh businessman Dan Rooney, in 1976, and for many years this and later similar initiatives in other countries, took up a considerable amount of his time. The funds, representing a network with more than ten national entities, had raised over $600 million to date. O'Reilly was the chairman.

== Personal life ==
=== Family ===
O'Reilly was first engaged in 1958, to Dorothy Connolly, whom he had met in 1954, with the marriage planned for 1959.

He met his first wife, Australian secretary and pianist Susan M. Cameron, the daughter of a wealthy Australian mining figure in whose name he endowed a professorship at UCD for at least a decade, in 1959 in Australia, after she was suggested as a social contact when he was touring for rugby. After courting her when she moved to London, they married in 1962. He had six children with her, born from 1963 to 1966: Susan Wildman, Anthony Cameron O'Reilly (generally "Cameron"), Justine O'Reilly, Gavin O'Reilly, Caroline Dempsey, and St John Anthony ("Tony Junior"); the last three are triplets. All three boys were involved in family business interests, while the daughters are not known to be, the eldest being a qualified pilot, the second a lawyer and the third a full-time mother. The eldest daughter took a bachelor's degree at Yale, and a master's degree in history at Oxford.

All the O'Reilly children married and there are 19 grandchildren. The youngest daughter, Caroline, was married at the restored Church of St. Mary at Castlemartin Estate on 1 June 1991, while eldest child, Susan, married investment banker Tarik C. Wildman (1959–) on 14 August 1993 before an Episcopal dean at the same church. Gavin O'Reilly married Alison Doody there some years later.

The O'Reillys separated in the late 1980s, and Susan O'Reilly settled in London, in a house bought by Tony O'Reilly. They later divorced, and Susan O'Reilly died in 2014.

O'Reilly later married Chryss Goulandris, a Greek shipping heiress, who bred and raced thoroughbred horses as "Skymarc Farms" and under other names, and who owned stud farms in Normandy and other locations. Chryss was well known on the racecourses of Ireland, Britain and France, as 'Lady O'Reilly', and was knowledgeable on all aspects of the equine industry. They first met in New York, when Chryss accompanied her brother to a business meeting and the wedding took place in the Bahamas on 4 September 1991.

Chryss made a naming gift in her husband's honour in 1999 with the O'Reilly Theater in Pittsburgh, and he bought her a famous Jackie Onassis diamond ring for over US$2 million. The second Mrs O'Reilly's brother was a close business ally of O'Reilly for many years, from around the time of the marriage. Lady O'Reilly died in August 2023.

=== Residences ===
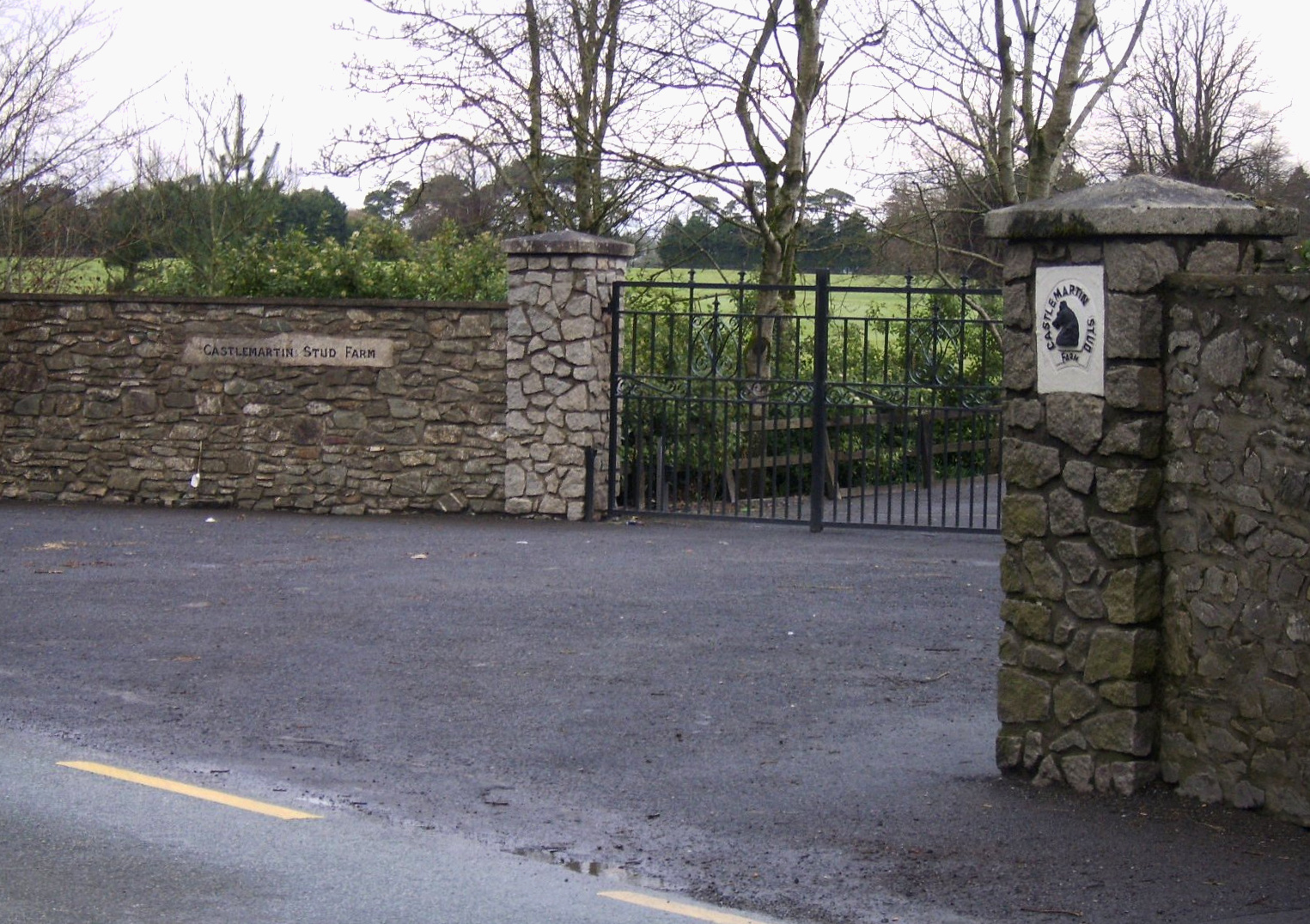
Castlemartin Estate entrance

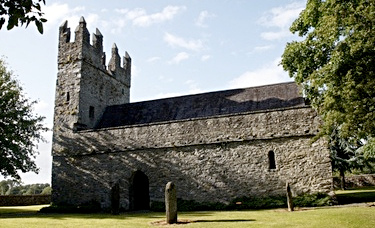
St Mary's Church, Castlemartin (restored)

A number of homes were associated with O'Reilly, including his main residence for more than 15 years, Lissadell Tamura in the private gated community of Lyford Cay, with a beach near Nassau in the Bahamas.

For many years his principal residence and later a major base was Castlemartin, a "big house" dating in current form from the 18th century, at Kilcullen, County Kildare (which has associated stud farm and cattle breeding premises on the large estate lands). O'Reilly purchased Castlemartin in 1972 from the Earl of Gowrie, and spent millions on improvements to the house and on the restoration of the 15th century Church of St Mary in the grounds. On 15 February 2008 permission was granted for the development of two ancillary houses on a remote part of the estate, adjoining Kilcullen (Bridge) village's main street, incorporating residential, restaurant and retail space. In October 2007, O'Reilly paid a record €125,000 per acre for 60-acre (240,000 m^{2}) Hollyhill Stud in Carnalway near Brannockstown, under 3 kilometres from Kilcullen. The stud farm on the banks of the Liffey, with a 10-room house and a cottage, was thought to have been intended for one of his daughters.

In late 1995, he and his wife purchased a former solicitor's office, a four-storey Georgian house at 2 Fitzwilliam Square, Dublin, with a courtyard and coach house with a separate entrance. The £1 million house, formerly owned by railway pioneer William Dargan, was a base when travel to Castlemartin was not feasible, and a place for meetings and his private office. O'Reilly also had a holiday compound, Shorecliffe, comprising several houses, garden areas and two swimming pools, by the sea in Glandore, County Cork.

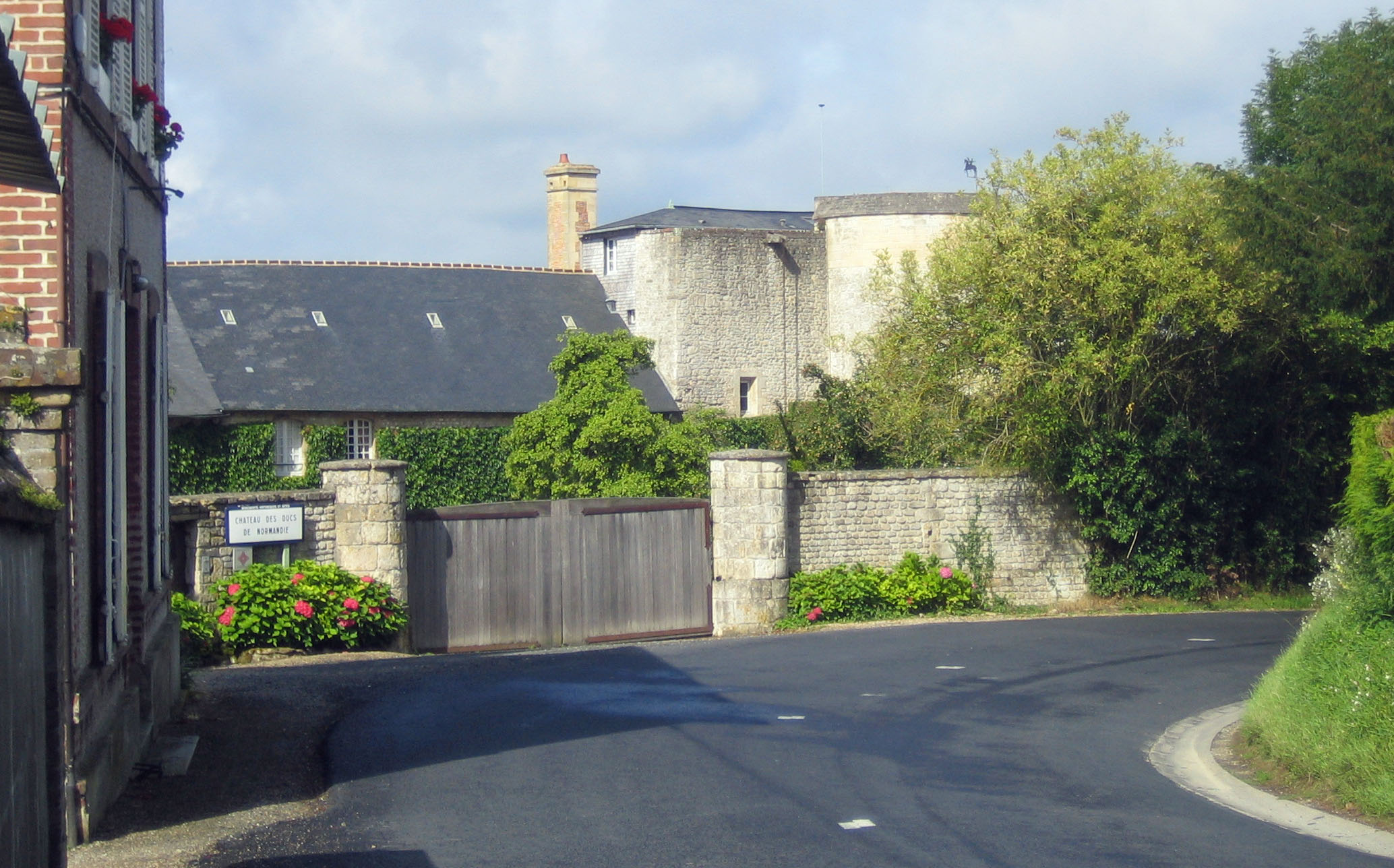
The chateau at Bonneville

The O'Reillys also owned a château "built on the ruins of the castle where William the Conqueror plotted his 1066 invasion of England" near Deauville in France.

For many years, a key O'Reilly residence was a 34-room mock Tudor house of 8,000 square feet (740 m^{2}) at Fox Chapel, Pittsburgh, with 7 acres (28,000 m^{2}) of grounds. This property, his second home in that area, with eight bedrooms and bathrooms, an "Irish bar" in the basement, tennis courts, Japanese and English-themed gardens and swimming and tennis facilities, was sold for around $US2.4 million in 2000.

The residential complex in Glandore, the house on Fitzwilliam Square and the Castlemartin Estate were all auctioned off at sales forced by O'Reilly's creditors. O'Reilly later lived in the Château des Ducs de Normandie in Bonneville-sur-Touques in France, and later again in a house near Castlemartin in County Kildare.

=== Sporting interests and driving ===
O'Reilly's sons said that he was a keen player of tennis late in life. For a period in the 1990s, O'Reilly chaired a committee set up by the then Lord Mayor of Dublin, Gay Mitchell, aiming to bring the Olympic Games to Dublin in 2004.

In February 1963, O'Reilly was involved in an accident between Urlingford and Johnstown, when his car struck a cyclist, who was injured. Locals testified that the injured man was careless, he had no lights or reflector and had been on the wrong side of the road. O'Reilly was convicted of driving with undue care and was fined 4 pounds.

=== Art collection ===
The O'Reillys were significant art collectors for many years, with the biggest known acquisition being Monet's Le Portail (Soleil), bought in 2000, at Sotheby's of London, for $US24 million, and others including works by William Orpen and Jack Yeats, and bronzes and statues. In June 2008 it was reported that O'Reilly had commissioned a bound catalogue of his art collection, 15 cm thick, at a cost of €125,000 for 500 copies, edited by Suzanne Macdougald and with notes by, among others, Bruce Arnold. Copies were said to have been given to the President of Ireland and the Queen of the United Kingdom.

=== Wealth and bankruptcy ===
In May 2014, The Sunday Times reported that O'Reilly and his wife had a net worth of around US$545 million, down sharply from March 2012, when the Sunday Independent reported that O'Reilly had a net worth of €1 billion, excluding his wife's estimated €300 million from her shipping family inheritances.

O'Reilly became locked in a legal case with a state-controlled Irish bank, Allied Irish Banks (AIB), in relation to his multimillion-euro debts, with AIB seeking a summary judgment against him at the High Court. The commercial court in Dublin refused a six-month stay or delay in a judgement against O'Reilly. In June 2014, the court entered a judgement of nearly €46 million against him. Judge Peter Kelly said he believed there was force in the argument that O'Reilly and his investment companies were insolvent. During the hearing, lawyers for O'Reilly admitted that he also owed large amounts to other banks and financial institutions. This meant O'Reilly would have to sell properties in Ireland to meet his debts to AIB bank.

In the wake of AIB's €22.6 million judgement debt against him, O'Reilly filed for bankruptcy in March 2016. His lawyers disclosed that he had liabilities of more than €170 million and realisable assets of only €23 million. ACC Bank was owed the most, holding a debt of almost €47 million; it was followed by the UK's Lloyds Bank International with €45.6 million and US distressed debt fund Lone Star Funds with €44 million. Among the Irish banks, AIB was then owed €15.5 million (having reduced its debt by collecting most of the €7.4 million sale proceeds of O'Reilly's County Kildare home, Castlemartin); Bank of Ireland was at the time owed €2.1 million and Ulster Bank €1.2 million, while he owed €7.2 million to Bahamian lender EFG Bank & Trust and €5.7 million to BNY Mellon (Bank of New York Mellon). O'Reilly exited bankruptcy in December 2023.

O'Reilly's former long-time nurse and assistant of 13 years, Sabina Vidunas, filed a lawsuit against O'Reilly in Pennsylvania in 2013, claiming that he owed her $40 million stock in a deal that he reneged on. O'Reilly's lawyers argued that his Bahamas bankruptcy applied also in America and thus negated her claim, however the US Bankruptcy Court for the Western District of Pennsylvania declared that O'Reilly could not claim that his Bahamas bankruptcy automatically applied in the United States, because by then his "center of main interests" did not lie in the Bahamas" but in France, where he had settled since the case began. Because no evidence was presented of "any operations or nontransitory economic activity in the Bahamas", the Bahamian bankruptcy would probably not be recognised for a lesser, "non-main center", argument either. Vidunas's lawsuit was still ongoing as of 2020.

=== Death and legacy ===
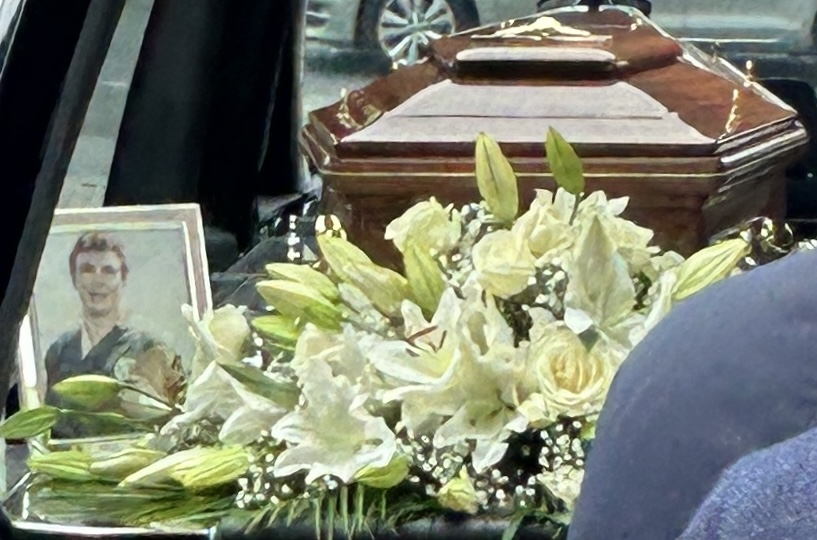
After the funeral, Donnybrook

O'Reilly died, after a short illness, at St. Vincent's University Hospital, Dublin, on 18 May 2024, at the age of 88. The Taoiseach, Simon Harris, paid tribute to O'Reilly, describing him as "a giant of sport, business and media" and "a trailblazer"; the O'Reilly family also released a statement. The President of Ireland released a statement of tribute the next day, noting "so many aspects of Irish life that Anthony O'Reilly touched in an innovative and changing way" and further noting the massive contribution his work with the Ireland Funds made, and his "personal commitment to staying with what he saw as a symbolic Irish activity in Waterford Crystal". Journalist Matt Cooper said of him that "Other than Taoisigh and Ministers for Finance, few were as powerful and influential in the late 20th century and the first decade of 21st century Ireland".

O'Reilly's removal was on 22 May 2024, to Church of the Sacred Heart, Donnybrook, Dublin 4, the parish church to which O'Reilly was long attached. It was attended by his six children, the current Taoiseach and past officeholders, and hundreds more. His funeral, led by a friend from the Jesuit order and concelebrated by 6 other priests, took place the following morning. His children led the mourners, along with Ireland's Tánaiste and representatives of the President of Ireland and the Taoiseach, and hundreds more, including a range of business, cultural and rugby union figures. It was announced that his cremation on 24 May would be private, and that his grandchildren and other family members would gather for a private memorial service later in the year. One of his daughters read his favourite poem, Kipling's If—, another the first reading, and all three of his sons delivered eulogies.

=== Awards and honours ===
In 1978, O'Reilly was awarded an honorary Doctorate of Laws (LLD) by Trinity College Dublin.

In 1988, he was appointed an Honorary Officer of the Order of Australia (AO) for services to Irish-Australian relationships.

O'Reilly was knighted in the 2001 New Year Honours "for long and distinguished service to Northern Ireland"; including in recognition for his work as head of The Ireland Funds charity. O'Reilly, who described himself as a constitutional nationalist, sought the approval of the Irish Government in relation to the award, because it is a requirement of the Constitution of Ireland that "No title of nobility or of honour may be accepted by any citizen except with the prior approval of the Government". As O'Reilly was also a British subject, in part due to his pre-1949 Irish birth, he held a substantive and not just an honorary knighthood, and could validly style himself Sir, as he did, using the style "Sir Anthony O'Reilly". (see British honours system.)

== Biographical publications ==
An authorised biography, The Player: The Life of Tony O'Reilly, was written by Ivan Fallon, a journalist and biographer in the early 1990s, later a senior executive at one of O'Reilly's companies, and was for many years the only study of any length. O'Reilly facilitated the project, and the author was given access to family members, including past and current wives, and to staff and business colleagues. Fallon insisted in the foreword that he had complete discretion on what to include and how to tell it, excluding only some private family matters. While giving great detail on some business matters, the book says almost nothing about O'Reilly's children and little of his second wife. It gives considerable detail on business matters and questions some of O'Reilly's assertions, notably about his Irish business interests. It also gives much information on O'Reilly's parents' situations and especially his father's family, some of which the author notes even O'Reilly did not have until the book gathered it, and includes some detail about his residences.

In 2015, another biography of O'Reilly was written by journalist Matt Cooper and published by Gill and Macmillan. Titled "The Maximalist: The Rise and Fall of Tony O'Reilly", the book is said to offer an "overview of a man described by the publishers as "one of Ireland's most remarkable public figures"".

== See also ==
- List of honorary British knights and dames
- List of the 100 wealthiest people

== Cited sources ==
- Fallon, Ivan (1994) The Player: The Life of Tony O'Reilly. Coronet. ISBN 0340639792
