= Tony O'Reilly Jr. =

Irish businessman

- Born: St. John Anthony O'Reilly; 17 December 1966 (age 59); Dublin, Ireland
- Occupation: Former chief executive of Providence Resources
- Spouses: Robin Rafford (m. 1993–2006) Michele Clements (m. 2008)
- Children: 3
- Father: Tony O'Reilly

St. John Anthony O'Reilly (born 17 December 1966), generally known as Tony O'Reilly Jr., is a businessman with Irish and Australian citizenship, the third son and sixth child of former Heinz Chairman & CEO and Irish media magnate Tony O'Reilly and Australian Susan Cameron. He is the former CEO of the Irish-based oil and gas exploration company Providence Resources PLC and the former chairman and CEO of Arcon, an Irish-based zinc mining company. He is currently the CEO of UK and Ireland focused geo energy transition company dCarbonX. He is married for the second time, with three children and three stepchildren and lives in Malta.

== Early life and career ==
He was born, the youngest of six, and one of triplets, in 1966, in Dublin, and brought up in Ireland, at Castlemartin in County Kildare, and Fox Chapel, Pittsburgh, US. After a difficult time at Harrow School, he moved to London at the age of fifteen for 6 months, living in a bedsit flat for £25 a week, working at a supermarket and with a landscape gardener. He then returned to the family, later finishing secondary education at Clongowes Wood College and then studying economics and history at Brown University, Rhode Island, with an exchange year at the London School of Economics. At Brown University he was a member of the Sigma Chi fraternity.

== Career ==
He started work at Morgan Grenfell but was let go after less than three weeks when his division was closed. After six months looking for a job, Tony O'Reilly Senior brought him on a business trip, on which he was speaking at the international convention of Coopers & Lybrand partners, after which he worked for that company for two and a half years working in the New York corporate finance department.

In 1992, he relocated to Ireland, to work for mining company Arcon (part-owned by his father), responsible for Planning and Corporate Development for the Galmoy Zinc Mine. He was promoted and was CEO from 1997 to 2000, and chairman from 2001 to 2005. In 2005, he drove the merger of Arcon with Lundin Mining, a Canadian-based mining company, and joined their board.

He was appointed a director of Waterford Wedgwood, dominated by his father, in 1998, and deputy CEO of the division of famous ceramics brand Wedgwood from 1 January 2001. He was made CEO of Wedgwood soon after. At the same time, he was a director of Independent News and Media, Providence, Fitzwilton Plc and Lockwood Financial Group .

He moved from Wedgwood in September 2005 to take up the role as CEO of Providence, which he had founded in 1997 by divesting the hydrocarbon assets out of Arcon. In 2005, O'Reilly led the listing of Providence ion the Alternative Investments Market (AIM) of the London Stock Exchange. Over the next 14 years, Providence was involved in oil and gas exploration and production in Ireland, the UK, US and Nigeria. The company is in partnership with a number of international firms including ExxonMobil, Chevron, Transocean and Petronas. In December 2019, after nearly 15 years at the helm, he stepped down as CEO to pursue other opportunities.

== Philanthropy ==
O'Reilly supports the work of The Ireland Funds and is a trustee of the O'Reilly Foundation

== Personal life ==
He became engaged to Robin O'Reilly, née Rafford, whom he met while she was an advertising planner with Peter Owens, in November 1992, and they married mid-1993. Mrs O'Reilly, a graduate of Cornell, Columbia (for an MBA), subsequently studied at the Royal College of Surgeons in Ireland, qualifying as a doctor, and later specialising in oncology. She also became a major figure on the Dublin social scene, often seen with her sister-in-law Alison Doody.

The couple divorced in 2006, and in mid-2007 Mrs O'Reilly's Dublin home was sold, with a statement saying she planned to move to the UK to work in the art industry.

He then divided his time between Dublin and weekends in Malta. Two of his children, lived in London, while his eldest son lives in Malta.

He became engaged to Michele Clements (née Calascione) in August 2007, and married for the second time on 4 July 2008, at Lake Como in Italy, with a reception at the Villa Pizzo. His children, and his new wife's three children, Josh, Sasha and Alana also, attended, along with family and friends. Born Calascione, Ms Clements is the second of four children of Alfred Calascione and Stephanie De Cesare, and was previously married.

== Sources ==
- London, The Daily Telegraph: Business Profile: His Father's Providence, 24 July 2006, Topaz Amoore
