= O'Reilly Foundation =

Irish charitable trust

The O'Reilly Foundation is a personal charitable trust set up in 1998 by media magnate, and former CEO of Heinz, Sir Anthony "Tony" O'Reilly. Its stated function is the funding of educational projects; the two main work areas in its active period were funding of capital developments at Irish colleges, and an annual post-graduate scholarship programme for young people normally resident in Ireland, with the aim of "supporting charitable endeavours for the betterment of Ireland and to promote excellence, global vision, community responsibility and leadership."

== Governance and staffing ==
General authority is vested in a board of trustees including, from the beginning, O'Reilly's wife Chryss Goulandris, Lady O'Reilly, as chairperson, plus his six children from his first marriage: Susan Wildman, Cameron O'Reilly, Justine O'Reilly, Gavin O'Reilly, Caroline Dempsey, and Tony O'Reilly, Junior.

The oversight of the postgraduate scholarship scheme was vested in the Scholarship Board, first chaired by the economist T. K. Whitaker, and subsequently by former Registrar of University College Dublin, Professor Emeritus John Kelly.

The Foundation has just one staff member, an executive secretary.

== Capital projects ==
The Foundation made a major contribution in May 2000 to complete funding of the 50% privately funded €22.2 million new library building for Dublin City University, later named "The John and Aileen O'Reilly Library" in honour of Dr. O'Reilly's parents.

== Scholarship programme ==
=== Sponsorship ===
The programme, which began in 1999, provided awards of around 25,400 euro annually. In most years, two Scholars were nominated, for two years each, but in some years, there were three Scholars, and in some years, there could be a Scholar with a one-year award. The Foundation sponsored scholars who have an excellent academic record (First Class Honours - in the Irish / British systems - preferred) and who "have demonstrated leadership qualities", as well as the "potential and desire to make a significant contribution to the future of Ireland" .

The scholarships were stated to be chiefly aimed at Ph.D. candidates but have in fact been awarded for a wide range of types of student. Certain disciplines were noted as preferences, namely Business Studies and Marketing, Science and Technology, Arts, Media Studies and Law.

=== Alumni ===
Over the first eleven years, or as the official website calls them, "cycles", of the programme, there were 26 awards made. Among the awardees were:

- Ruth Gilligan, 11th cycle, commencing 2009, BA in English Literature at Cambridge University, to be followed by a Masters in Creative Writing at a US university

==== Suspension of new awards, 2009 ====
After 11 cycles, the Trustees decided to invite no applications and make no award in 2009, pending a review of the work of the Programme to date by the Board of Trustees, with inputs from the Scholarship Board.
