= Seven Ages =

- Directed by: Seán Ó Mórdha
- Music by: Bill Whelan
- Country of origin: Ireland
- No. of episodes: 7

Production
- Producer: Seán Ó Mórdha
- Running time: 55 minutes
- Production companies: Araby Productions, O'Reilly Foundation

Original release
- Network: RTÉ; BBC Northern Ireland
- Release: 2000

Seven Ages is a historical documentary series that was produced by Araby Productions, in association with The O'Reilly Foundation, for RTÉ and BBC Northern Ireland. It charts the birth, growth and development of the Irish state since its foundation in 1921. The series was produced and directed by Seán Ó Mórdha, and the music was composed by Bill Whelan. It was first broadcast in 2000. It won the Television Features and Documentary Award at the ESB National Media Awards in 2000, and was also shortlisted for the IFTA Awards.

== Episodes ==
The series consists of seven 55-minute episodes, each dealing with a different decade, beginning with independence in 1921. The episodes do not, however, stick rigidly to their particular decade in order to avoid certain historical events from being split across two successive programmes (the Arms Crisis is an example of this). The final episode covers both the 1980s and 1990s.

- Programme 1. The Birth of the New Irish State
- Programme 2. Depression and the Rise of Fianna Fáil to Power
- Programme 3. The Forties - Decade of Neutrality and Censorship
- Programme 4. The Fifties - The Make or Break Decade
- Programme 5. The Modernisation of Ireland
- Programme 6. The Seventies - A Decade of Terror, Tension and Transformation
- Programme 7. Haughey and FitzGerald - Great Adversaries of the Eighties

== Contributors ==
Several important Irish figures gave interviews for the series. Among them were ex-Presidents Patrick Hillery and Mary Robinson, and former Taoisigh Liam Cosgrave, Charles Haughey and Garret FitzGerald. There are also contributions from Desmond O'Malley and Michael D. Higgins, as well as historians, journalists, economists, public servants and the sons and daughters of Civil War veterans.

== Video and DVD release ==
In 2002 the series was released as a box-set on both VHS and DVD. The former consisted of three video cassettes, which are in PAL format. The two-disc DVD set, however, was mastered in NTSC format (used in North America and Japan). As a consequence, the DVDs are not watchable an older Irish television sets that can only accept standard PAL signals if used with a DVD player that strictly enforces output coding. Although there may be some interested in the series in America, it is assumed that the NTSC formatting was a mistake by the company that mastered the DVDs. Additionally, neither the DVD inlay nor the DVD itself has any mention of the NTSC formatting.
