= John Kelly (engineer) =

Irish chemical engineer, former registrar of University College Dublin

John J. Kelly (11 May 1935 – 12 November 2022) was a senior Irish academic. A professor of chemical engineering, he was for a period dean of the Faculty of Engineering at University College Dublin (UCD, where he was also registrar / deputy president). He was executive director of the Ireland Canada University Foundation, chairman of the Scholarship Board of the O'Reilly Foundation, and president of Independent College Dublin, and chairman of the board of trustees of the Friends of Bethlehem University in Ireland.

== Early life ==
John Kelly was born in Newry, Northern Ireland, 11 May 1935, the fourth of seven children of Rita Curran and John Vincent Kelly. He attended two local schools and St. Patrick's College in Armagh. He then attended a boarding school Castleknock College, on the outskirts of Dublin, from 1947 to 1953, where he became Head Prefect and captained a rugby team.

Kelly pursued a bachelor's degree in chemical engineering at University College Dublin (UCD). After graduating in 1957, he worked in industry, as a process engineer and later manager, in Ireland and the UK, from 1957 to 1963. Kelly was captain of the University College Dublin and the Irish Universities swimming teams in 1956 /57 and played rugby in Munster with Highfield in the 1960s.

== University career ==
Kelly returned to UCD as a lecturer, and obtained his PhD in 1968. He was a Senior Fulbright Scholar at the University of Maryland from 1969 to 1970. He was promoted to senior lecturer at UCD in 1976, holding that post until 1985, and during this period was elected three times as dean of the Faculty of Engineering and Architecture, starting in 1979. He was visiting professor at the University of Missouri-Rolla in 1982.

In 1986, he commenced office as Registrar of UCD, and when his term of office ended, he was appointed Professor of Chemical Engineering.

He became a member of the Governing Bodies of UCD and Dublin City University in 1982, remaining on the former until 1998 and the latter until 1987. He was elected by the Governing Body of UCD to the Senate of the National University of Ireland, of which UCD is a constituent university, in late 1982, and was co-opted to two further terms (from 1987 and 1992), and elected to another five-year term by the NUI's Convocation in 1997. He was also the founder, and a director, of the UCD industrial development facility, UIC, now Nova UCD.

Kelly was a founder of UCD's Engineering Graduates Association. He was made an Honorary Life Fellow of the Institution of Engineers of Ireland in 1990, and a Fellow of the Irish Academy of Engineering in 2000. Leaving the regular staff of UCD, he has been emeritus professor since 2000.

Kelly was awarded the Doctorate of Humanities, Honoris Causa, by the University of Bethlehem in Palestine in 2012.

In 2018 Kelly was presented with the ESB Outstanding Contribution to Engineering Award at the 2017 Engineers Ireland Excellence Awards.

== Publications ==
Kelly has co-authored or authored more than a hundred technical and professional articles or book chapters, and two books.

He has also written letters and leader and education comment articles in the Irish Times, notably on the battle between Newman's "community of scholars" concept and vocationalism, academic pay, European student exchange and in latter times, on Palestine and Bethlehem University.

He has also been editor or joint editor of multiple journals.

== Other roles ==
Kelly led a European Community delegation to the Faculty of Engineering & Technology (FET) in the University of Jordan from 1981 to 1986, and chaired the team which assisted in the establishment of the HIAST, the Higher Institute of Advanced Science & Technology in Damascus, Syria in 1987. He sat on Ireland's National Board of Science and Technology from 1982 to 1986. He was the founding chairman of the Association for Higher Education Access and Disability, AHEAD, the Irish national organisation for students with disabilities.

He has worked with many organisations including: the Universities of the Capital Cities of Europe, the European University Industry Forum, the Committee of Rectors of Europe, the Irish Research Council for Science, Engineering and Technology, and Directorate-General XXII for Education of the European Union. He was a member of the IEP, the Institutional Evaluational Panel of the European University Association, from 1994 to 2006, and a member of the International Advisory Board to the Hungarian Accreditation Committee from 1998 to 2004.

Kelly was the first executive director of the Ireland Canada University Foundation, the founding president of the Irish Fulbright Alumni Association, chairman of the Irish Aid Advisory Committee to Ireland's Department of Foreign Affairs, and the founding executive director of the Ireland-United States Commission for Educational Exchange ("the Irish Fulbright Commission"), one of the 50 or so Fulbright Commissions.

In the late 1990s, he was invited to become a member of the Scholarship Board of the O'Reilly Foundation, a charitable trust established by billionaire media magnate Sir Anthony O'Reilly, and in 2001, he became the second chairman of that body.

He is a director of Feenish Films, and was a member of the board of CHC, the Canadian Helicopter Corporation, and of the board of the Ireland Newfoundland Partnership. He chaired the international group which advised the Government of Newfoundland & Labrador on its structures of higher education in 2006. He also chaired the Dispute Resolution Committee of National University of Ireland, Cork, and until 2012 the council of the Friends of Bethlehem University in Ireland. He has also been president of Independent College, Dublin, and Chairman of Element Fleet Technology Limited, the Irish branch of the Canadian company Element Fleet Management Corporation.

== Personal life ==
Kelly lives in Dublin, and in May 1968 married Nora Doyle; they have four children, three boys and one girl. He captained the Irish Water Skiing Team at the North European Championships in Amsterdam in 1965. In later years, Kelly was captain of the Supervets +70 tennis team at Fitzwilliam Lawn Tennis Club in Dublin.

Kelly publicly criticised UCD for a planned failure to attend the canonisation of its founder in late 2019, and the university subsequently reversed its position.
