= Taffin =

- Theatrical release poster
- Directed by: Francis Megahy
- Screenplay by: David Ambrose
- Based on: Taffin by Lyndon Mallet
- Produced by: Peter Shaw
- Starring: Pierce Brosnan; Ray McAnally; Alison Doody
- Cinematography: Paul Beeson
- Edited by: Peter Tanner
- Music by: Stanley Myers; Hans Zimmer
- Production companies: United British Pictures; Rafford Films; Metro-Goldwyn-Mayer
- Distributed by: Vestron Pictures (UK); MGM/UA Communications Co. (US)
- Release date: 26 February 1988
- Running time: 96 minutes
- Countries: Ireland; United Kingdom; United States
- Language: English
- Box office: $159,969

Taffin is a 1988 thriller film directed by Francis Megahy and starring Pierce Brosnan in the title role of Mark Taffin. It also featured Ray McAnally, Alison Doody and Jeremy Child. It is based on Lyndon Mallet's book series.

== Plot ==
Mark Taffin, a debt collector in the small town of Ballymoran, uses his smarts and martial arts skills to help locals collect debts they are owed. He beats up a restaurant owner and collects his car to pay the man's debt, and aids a trio of young men who have been sold a faulty van. He also helps Charlotte, a local barmaid, who is having trouble with her employer, and she becomes his girlfriend.

Taffin learns a local councillor, Gibson, is conspiring with a landowner named Henderson to hide the ownership of the landowner's meadow so that a local sports field will be sold instead of the meadow, and the meadow will be worth much more as building land once a planned chemical plant is built beside it on the sports field. Taffin confronts Gibson, but is unable to change anything until he intimidates Henderson by blowing up his outhouse.

The corrupt business syndicate behind the chemical plant hires some thugs, including Conway, to intimidate the townspeople. The thugs beat up Taffin, who once again withdraws from town, berating Charlotte for her wish that Taffin should be out helping the world in some way, until Conway and his thugs beat up Taffin's brother, Mo.

The trio of young men who aided Taffin, as well as Taffin's friend Ed help him take down two of Conway's thugs, and Taffin himself beats up Conway after a car chase between Conway's Jaguar and Taffin’s red, Ford Mustang through the winding rural roads. One of the corrupt syndicate, Mr. Martin, is accused of rape by Charlotte at Taffin's behest, so Taffin can blackmail Martin into entering the building of the chemical plant.

Taffin's plot seems to work, but the head of the syndicate, Sprawley, hires a hitman named Deacon who sets fire to Martin's house, killing him and his wife and framing Taffin for the crime. Despite there being no evidence that Taffin is guilty, the townspeople turn on Taffin as he earlier said they would.

Sprawley offers Deacon one last job—to kill Mark Taffin. Taffin tries to leave town to find Sprawley but Deacon gets to him first and enlists Conway to hold Taffin hostage in his car, forcing Taffin to follow Deacon to a remote spot where he can be killed. However, Taffin gets the upper hand on Conway and Deacon, shooting them both dead. A distant shot shows his car blowing up, and Taffin presumably dies.

Charlotte berates the townspeople for being too cowardly to do what Taffin did and then turning on him. Taffin, masquerading as Deacon, meets Sprawley on a deserted beach in Dublin, telling him to clear his name, and shooting Sprawley when he refuses and pulls a gun on him. Charlotte goes to leave the country, but Taffin appears behind her in the queue as she waits for the bus to the airport, telling her: "Be cool, Charlotte. Be cool."

== Cast ==
- Pierce Brosnan as Mark Taffin
- Ray McAnally as O'Rourke
- Alison Doody as Charlotte
- Jeremy Child as Mr. Martin
- Dearbhla Molloy as Mrs. Martin
- Jim Bartley as Conway
- Alan Stanford as Sprawley
- Gerard McSorley as Ed
- Patrick Bergin as Mo Taffin
- Britta Smith as Mrs. Taffin
- Jonathan Ryan as Councilor Gibson
- Liz Lloyd as Valerie Gibson
- Ronan Wilmot as Deacon
- Liam O'Callaghan as Mr. Henderson
- Frank Kelly as Liam
- Dermot Morgan as Micky Guest
- Peter Caffrey as Restaurant Owner

== Production ==
The movie was developed by United British Artists.

Taffin was filmed in County Wicklow in Ireland in 1987 and 1988. Issues arose between the author Lyndon Mallet and the production company surrounding the casting of Pierce Brosnan in the role of Mark Taffin. This was due to the actual nature of the character in the book. In the book, Mark Taffin was never a handsome man; he was overweight and unattractive, a very different image to that portrayed by Brosnan.

== Release ==
The film was briefly released in the Western states of the United States in February 1988. It was released on home video by MGM/UA Home Video on June 28, 1988.

== Reception ==
Time Out called the film "confused and unexciting", deeming that Brosnan was not up to his job. Time Out also criticized the script, a sentiment echoed by Apollo Movie Guide, which thought Taffin was a "disappointment for anyone expecting a smart Brosnan thriller with the Irish touch."
