= Chryss Goulandris =

Greek-American businesswoman with Irish links (1950–2023)

Chryss Goulandris Χρυσάνθη Γουλανδρή
- Born: 27 June 1950
- Died: 23 August 2023 (aged 73)
- Citizenship: USA, Greece, Ireland
- Occupation: Businesswoman
- Spouse: Tony O'Reilly (m. 1991)

Chryssanthie, Lady O'Reilly (née Goulandris; also known as Christina; 27 June 1950 – 23 August 2023) was a Greek-American-Irish businesswoman who was one of the richest women associated with Ireland. For many years, she owned a major horse breeding operation located in Ireland, France and other countries and was chairperson of the Irish National Stud for over a decade. She was the wife of former media and industrial magnate Tony O'Reilly, and was heavily involved with The Ireland Funds.

== Biography ==
Chryss Goulandris was born in the United States to John Goulandris, a wealthy member of a Greek family of ship owners and operators, and Maria Lemos, from another Greek shipping dynasty. The family lived at the time in the Savoy Palace Hotel, with homes also in Greece, Connecticut, Switzerland and the Bahamas. She grew up primarily in America (on Fifth Avenue in Upper East Side, Manhattan), with holidays spent in Greece, chiefly on the family's ancestral home island, Andros.

Goulandris studied French civilisation and art history at the Sorbonne in Paris, then returned to New York, working in the family offices, her business activities ranging from silver futures trading to horse breeding. Every year for a decade, she came back to France, where La Louviere stud farm, managed by André Rainjonneau, was her French home.

She met Tony O'Reilly briefly, with her brother Petros Goulandris, in Manhattan in 1989, at the Pierre Hotel, his usual base when staying in New York; he was in New York seeking funding for Waterford Wedgwood. They next met in 1990, after O'Reilly invited her to the Heinz 57 race in Dublin that year (she knew Ireland because of horse racing and breeding and was already considering buying a stud farm there), and a relationship developed, with the two becoming a couple in Lyford Cay the following Easter. On 14 September 1991, they were married in the Bahamas, Goulandris's first marriage and O'Reilly's second. At the time, their personal fortunes was each said to be around $500 million.

In 1996, Tony O'Reilly bid $2.6 million for the 40 carats (8.0 g) diamond engagement ring of Jacqueline Onassis, to give as a gift to Goulandris, who had known the Onassis family, and she, with some H. J. Heinz Company executives, made a naming gift in her husband's honour in 1999 with the O'Reilly Theater in Pittsburgh.

Goulandris died suddenly in Normandy on 23 August 2023, at the age of 73 (she had been receiving treatment for breast cancer but had been attending the horse sales in Deauville the previous day and had mingled with buyers and sellers from Ireland and elsewhere earlier in the week).

== Homes ==
Goulandris shared a range of residences with her husband. Although not tax resident in Ireland, one of her main homes was Castlemartin House and Estate near Kilcullen, County Kildare, which included a horse stud facility and a Charolais cattle-breeding operation. She managed the restoration of the Georgian house's upper floor and roof. Her official main residence was a house in the closed executive development of Lyford Cay near Nassau, the Bahamas; others were a complex on the southern coast of Ireland at Shorecliffe, Glandore, County Cork, and a Georgian townhouse on Fitzwilliam Square, Dublin, and a chateau in Deauville, France. She also owned property in New York.

== Horse breeding ==
Goulandris owned, bred, trained and raced horses under a number of house names, including at least Castlemartin Stud (shared with her husband), Petra Bloodstock Agency, Skymarc Farm. Castlemartin Stud is situated on the estate around one of her principal homes, with operations in multiple countries, and her horses were trained in Ireland, England, Normandy in France and in the USA at a stud called Matagorda, with many trainers employed across the various locations.

Two of her uncles were involved in racing, one, George, winning the English Oaks in 1962 and another, Constantin, owning the La Louviere Stud in France. She bought her first racing horse, a yearling filly, in 1976, and in 1978, following her uncle Constantin's death, took over La Louviere Stud, helped by André Rainjonneau.

At the end of October 2006, she had around 100 horses in training, and 128 brood mares. Her operations have a policy of selling male foals, and one of those sold was Helissio who won the 1996 Prix de l'Arc de Triomphe, while one retained was European champion miler in 1991. In all, she bred 11 Group 1 winners, including two wins at Royal Ascot.

=== National Stud ===
In 1993, Goulandris was appointed to the board of the Irish National Stud by the Minister for Agriculture, and in early June 1998, she was made its chairperson by Joe Walsh, in succession to David Shubotham.

== Wealth ==
Estimates of her personal wealth have varied greatly, but have exceeded 400 million USD since the early 1990s. In June 2004, it was reported that she would be a major beneficiary of the sale of a family-owned unit of land in New York, assembled in the 1970s at a cost of about 25 million USD, for around 400 million USD and in 2005, her personal wealth was estimated at 442 million UK pounds.

== Other activities ==
In June 1994, she was appointed a non-executive director of Waterford Wedgwood plc, with special responsibility for organizing commemorative events for the bicentenary of the death of Josiah Wedgwood. She resigned from this role in January 2009. She was a director of the Wedgwood Museum Trust until June 2007 and was an honorary member.

Goulandris was Chairperson of the O'Reilly Foundation from its establishment, was invited by family friend Paul Newman to be first Chairperson of the Barrettstown Castle Hole in the Wall Club. According to the Irish Times, she was also a patron of the Irish Horse Welfare Trust.

=== The Ireland Funds ===
Goulandris was involved with The Ireland Funds for many years, especially with the annual Pittsburgh fundraising dinner. She was the President d'Honneur of the Ireland Fund of France, and funded since 1993 the bourse Chryss O'Reilly de l'Ireland Fund de France, a 2000 euro per annum scholarship for eight universities in Northern Ireland and the Republic of Ireland.

== Sources ==
- London, UK: The Racing Post, 15 July 2001, Michael Clower, "Lady O'Reilly Interview: Rebelline flies the flag for O'Reilly's worldwide empire" – "Lady O'Reilly, owner of Irish Oaks hope Rebelline, has 100 horses in training and 128 broodmares. Michael Clower went to see her at the Castlemartin stud and estate in County Kildare."
