= Bonneville-sur-Touques =

- Commune
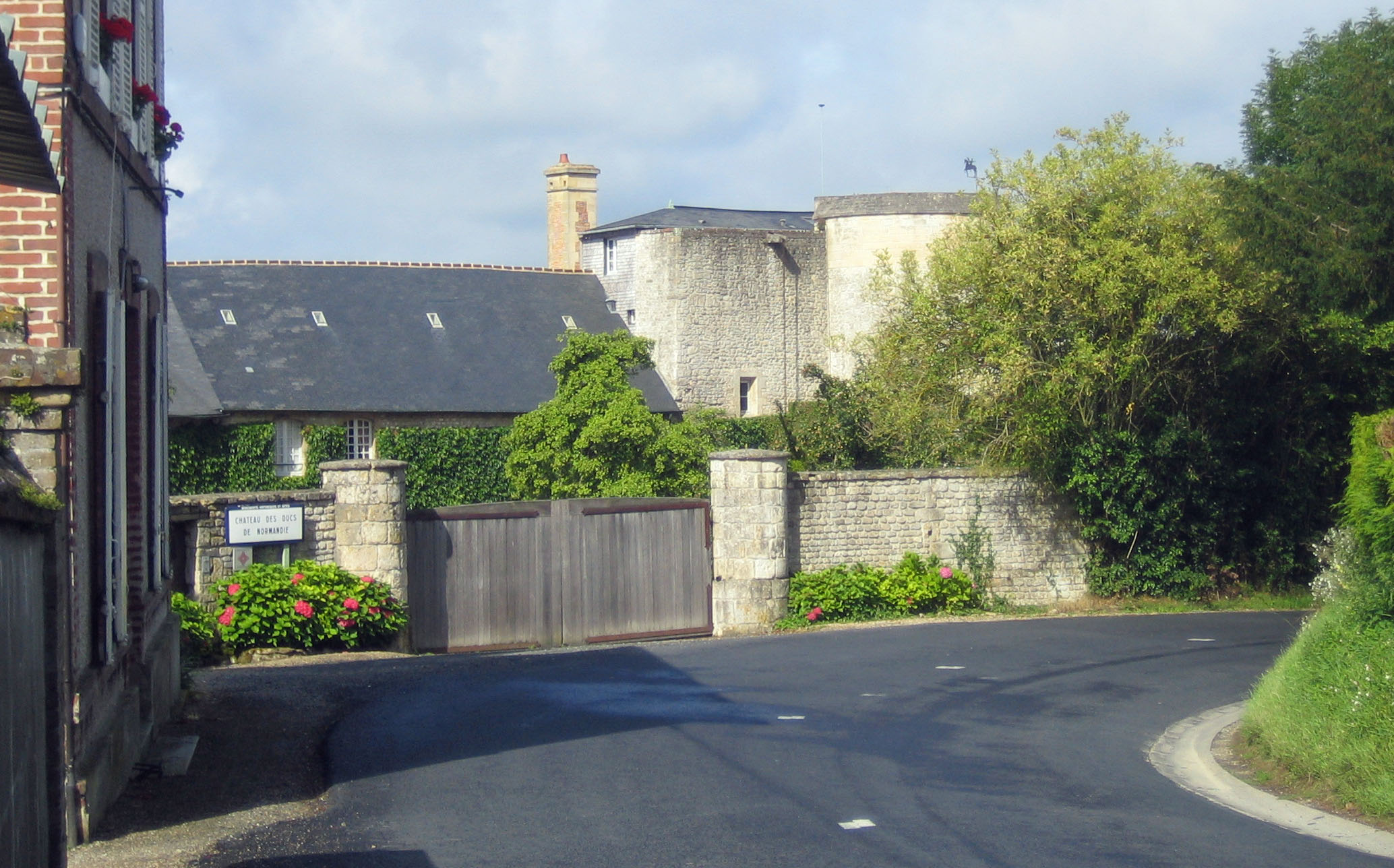
- The château in Bonneville-sur-Touques

- Coat of arms
- Location of Bonneville-sur-Touques
- Location within France Location within Normandy
- Coordinates: 49°20′20″N 0°07′14″E
- Country: France
- Region: Normandy
- Department: Calvados
- Arrondissement: Lisieux
- Canton: Pont-l'Évêque
- Intercommunality: CC Terre d'Auge

Government
  - Mayor (2020–2026): Florence Cothier
- Area^{1}: 6.63 km^{2} (2.56 sq mi)
- Elevation: 80 m (260 ft)
- Highest elevation: 132 m (433 ft)
- Lowest elevation: 3 m (9.8 ft)
- Population (2023): 307
  - Density: 46.3/km^{2} (120/sq mi)
- Time zone: UTC+01:00 (CET)
  - Summer (DST): UTC+02:00 (CEST)
- INSEE/Postal code: 14086 /14800
- ^{1} French Land Register data, which excludes lakes, ponds, glaciers > 1 km^{2} (0.386 sq mi or 247 acres) and river estuaries.

Bonneville-sur-Touques (French pronunciation: [bɔnvil syʁ tuk], Bonneville on Touques) is a commune in the Calvados department in the Normandy region in northwestern France, located four kilometres from the urban agglomeration Deauville-Trouville. The commune is principally famous for its 11th-century castle, which protected the nearby supply port of Touques. The population is 325 (2019).

== Etymology ==
The name Bonneville is attested as far back as 1014, when it appeared in the form Bonnavilla. Old French bonne, or good, already had its current meaning at that time, and ville, or town, which in placenames often has its original meaning of rural area (from the Latin villa rustica), might here have the later sense of "village".

== Government ==
The municipal council has 11 members, including the mayor and two deputies.

List of Mayors

In office	Name	Party	Profession
1989-March 2001	Marthe Belliot	-	-
March 2001-March 2014	Michel Lebey	Independent	farmer, breeder
March 2014-	Florence Cothier	Independent	Retired sales manager

== Demographics ==
Bonneville-sur-Touques's peak population was 476 in 1876.

Historical population

Year	Pop.	±% p.a.
1793	443	—
1821	410	−0.28%
1846	448	+0.36%
1876	476	+0.20%
1901	366	−1.05%
1926	349	−0.19%
1946	306	−0.66%
1962	269	−0.80%
1968	284	+0.91%

Year	Pop.	±% p.a.
1975	335	+2.39%
1982	342	+0.30%
1990	354	+0.43%
1999	318	−1.18%
2007	379	+2.22%
2012	392	+0.68%
2017	347	−2.41%
2023	307	−2.02%

Source: EHESS and INSEE

== Significant sites ==
- Château de Bonneville-sur-Touques, nicknamed "William the Conqueror's ruins" (11th century), classified as a historic monument since 16 November 1964
- Église Saint-Germain-et-Saint-Loup (18th century)
- Manoir de la Croix de fer (Iron Cross Manor), bought in 2006 by Tatiana Beck, for 1 million euros.

== Notable residents ==
- William the Conqueror frequently stayed at the castle when he went hunting in Saint-Gatien forest.
- John of England also lived at the castle.
- Tony O'Reilly, Irish businessman and international rugby player

== See also ==
- Communes of the Calvados department
