= Percy Le Clerc =

Inspector of National Monuments in Ireland

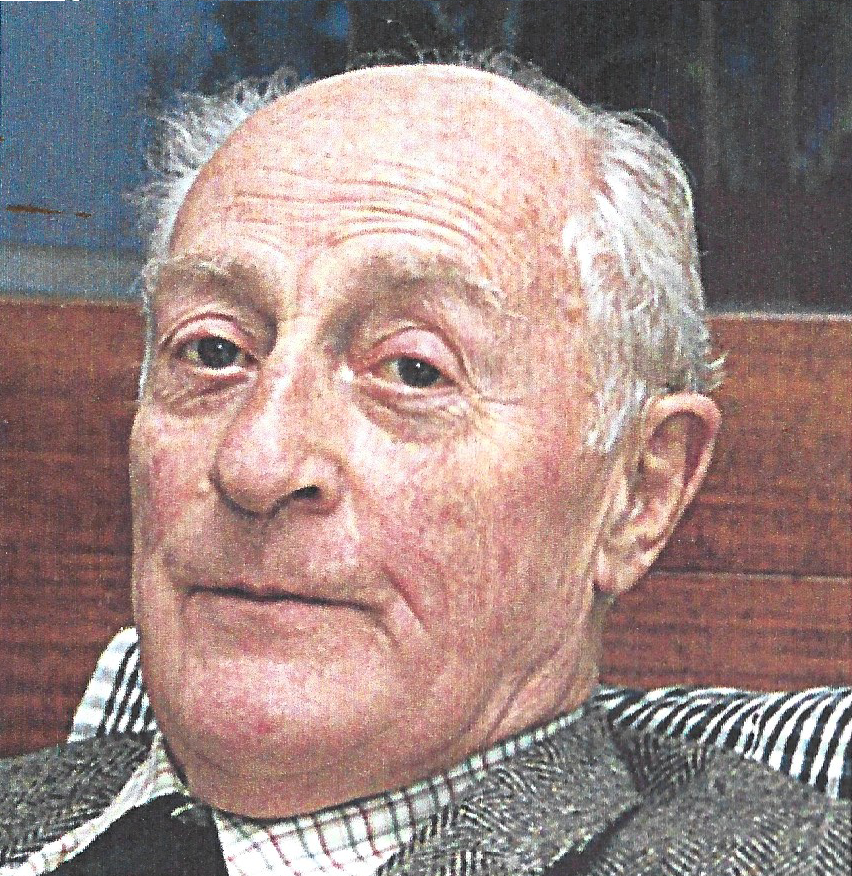
- Born: William Percival Le Clerc; 30 May 1914; Irlam, Lancashire, England
- Died: 4 March 2002 (aged 87); Versailles, France
- Known for: Inspector of National Monuments in Ireland

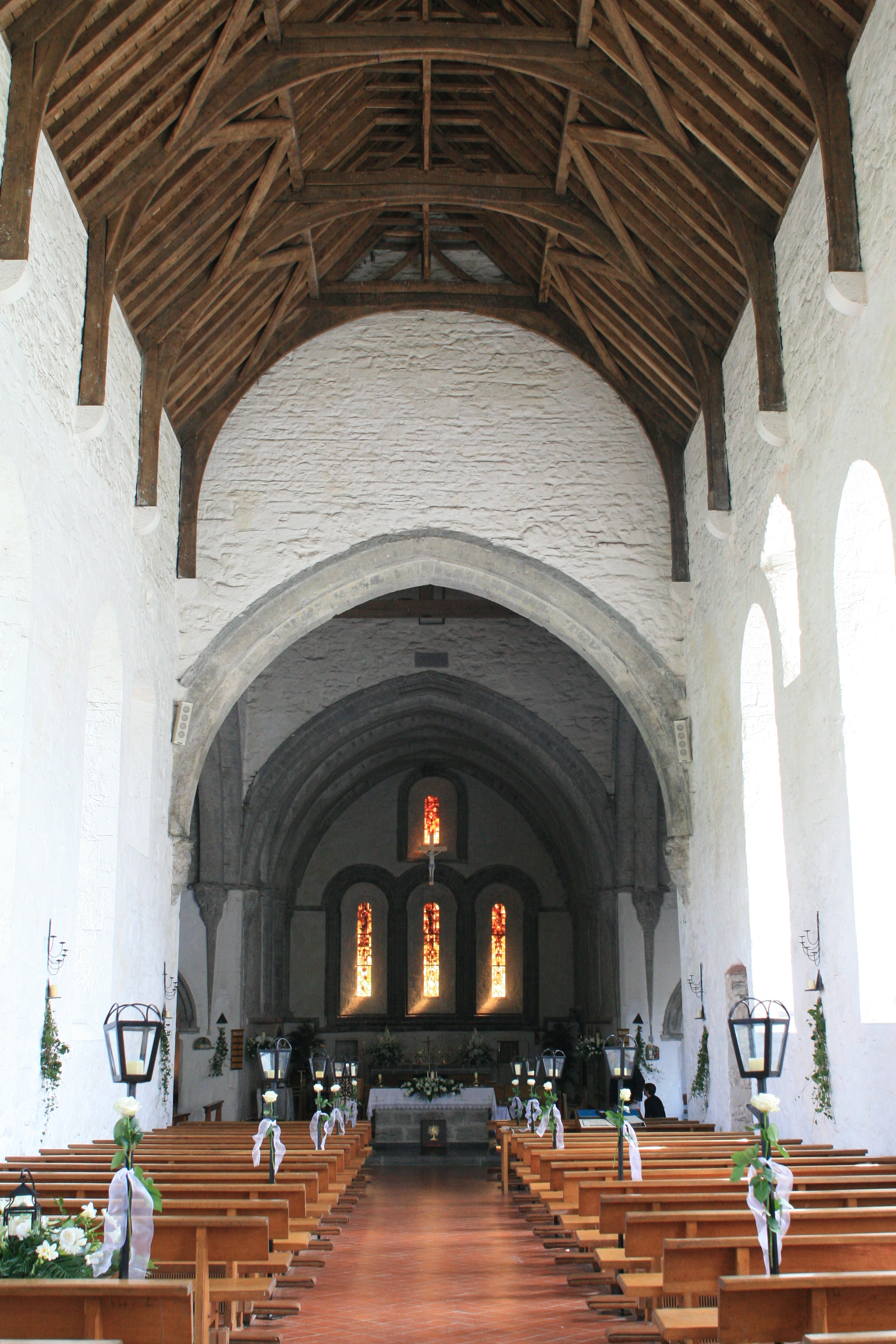
Nave of Ballintubber Abbey, restored by Le Clerc

William Percival "Percy" Le Clerc (30 May 1914 – 4 March 2002) was Inspector of National Monuments in Ireland from 1949 to 1974, making him responsible for the preservation of buildings already classified as National Monuments. He also made decisions on which further buildings in Ireland should be brought into state ownership or guardianship. He was a founding member of the Irish Georgian Society.

== Biography ==
Percy Le Clerc was born on 30 May 1914, in Irlam, Greater Manchester, where his father was the general practitioner. Percy was the youngest of the three sons of Robert Maurice Le Clerc and Edith Agatha Le Clerc (née Baylee). Robert Maurice Le Clerc was a graduate of Trinity College Dublin and was descended from a Huguenot refugee Pierre Le Clerc (1686-1773) of Charente, France, who became a wine merchant at Clarendon Street, Dublin. Edith Agatha Baylee had qualified as a nurse at Huddersfield General Hospital, having grown up at her family ancestral home, Mount Baylee, Kilkishen, County Clare. She was a great-granddaughter of Austin Cooper (1759-1830), of Abbeville, Kinsealy, County Dublin, who had created a unique record of Ireland's architectural heritage by compiling two large albums of beautifully executed pen and ink drawings of Ireland's castles, abbeys, churches and round towers.

In 1926 Le Clerc's family moved from Irlam to Kidlington, near Oxford. Having attended the Magdelen College School he matriculated to study engineering at Exeter College. He subsequently trained as an architect, specialising in history of architecture. He always maintained that his engineering studies greatly enhanced his ability to undertake major restoration projects.

In 1941 Le Clerc began work at the Board of Works in Dublin, becoming Inspector of National Monuments following the retirement of Harold G. Leask in 1949. He retired from this post in 1974 but continued work on the restoration of Holycross Abbey, Duiske Abbey and private commissions. At the age of 70 he moved to France where he could continue research into his Huguenot ancestry. He died in Versailles on 4 March 2002.

== Restorations carried out under his direction ==
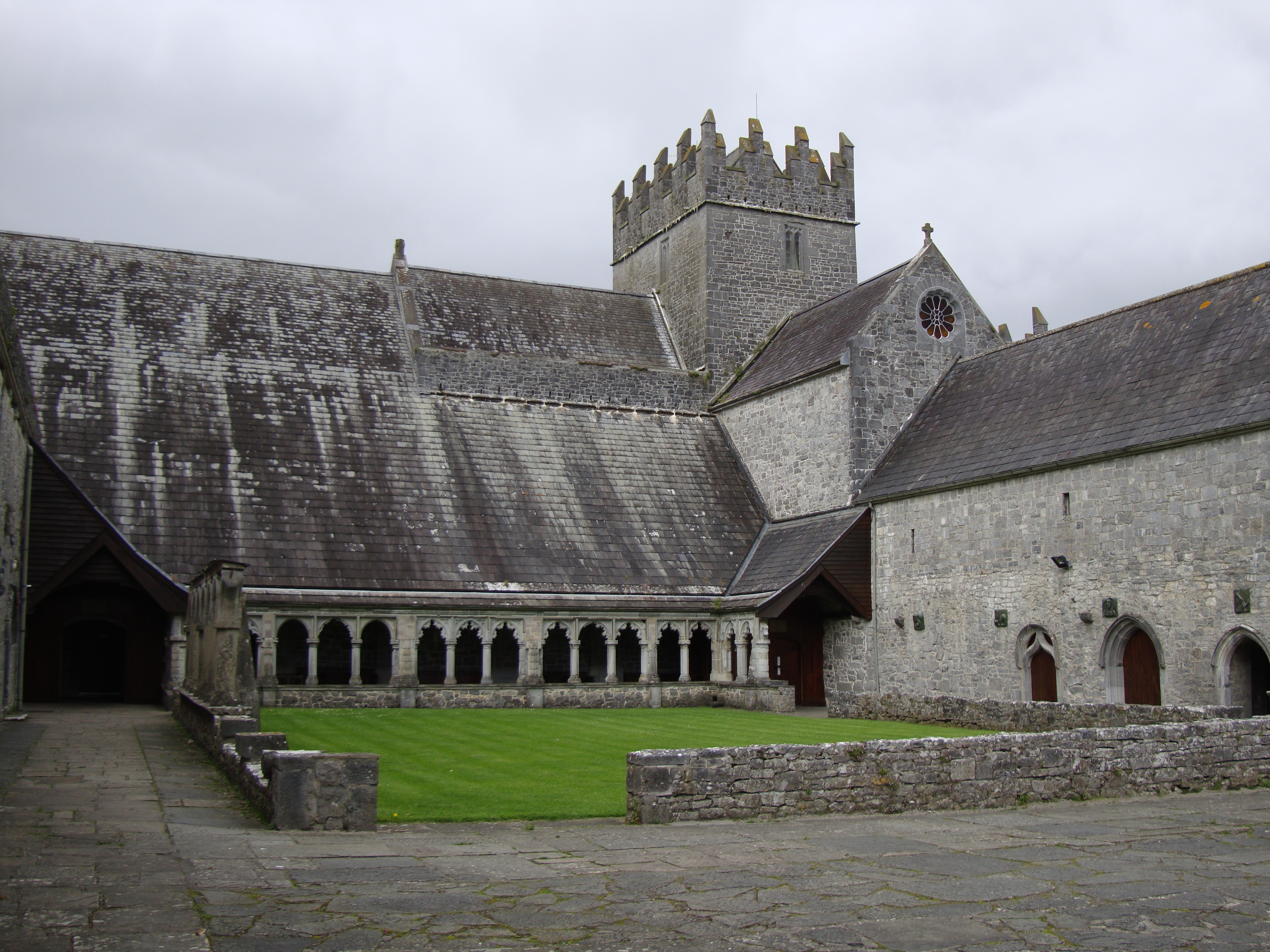
Holy Cross Abbey, County Tipperary

Le Clerc wrote: "Returning a building as close as possible to its original form, while making it the setting for present day activity should be the aim of restoration". Some of the projects directed by him, now in daily use, are as follows:

- Bunratty Castle, County Clare was purchased by Standish Vereker, 7th Viscount Gort in 1953. The castle was opened to the public, after extensive restoration, in 1960 and over the years has been developed into a major tourist hub.
- Rothe House, Kilkenny was completely restored for The Kilkenny Archaeological Society. The work commenced in 1961 and is described in detail by Luke Feeley, Clerk of Works, in the Old Kilkenny Review.
- Ballintubber Abbey, County Mayo, "the meticulous restoration of the nave" was carried out for Fr. Tom Egan and the parishioners. The work was completed in time for the 750th Anniversary celebrations in 1969, of "the abbey that refused to die". This project was awarded the Royal Institute of the Architects of Ireland Triennial Silver Medal for Restoration.
- Duiske Abbey, Graiguenamanagh, County Kilkenny, a partial restoration of this Abbey Church was carried out for Fr William Gavin and the parish, commencing in 1974.
- Holycross Abbey, County Tipperary was returned ecclesiastical use by the Holycross Abbey Act which was passed in 1969. The extensive restoration work which followed, "from roofless ruin to the Abbey that stands today", was carried out for Dr. Thomas Morris, Archbishop of Cashel. It was sufficiently advanced for the re-opening to take place in 1975, European Architectural Heritage Year. Holycross Abbey and village were chosen as one of Irelands pilot projects for EAHY. The work on the Abbey directed by Le Clerc was completed in 1976.

== Other works ==
- Clonmacnoise, County Offaly
- Blarney castle, County Cork
- Powerscourt House, County Wicklow
- St. Nicholas Collegiate Church, Galway
- Aughnanure Castle, County Galway
- St. Canice's Cathedral, Kilkenny are some of the sites where work was carried out under the direction of Le Clerc.

Privately, he worked with the owners of St. Mary's Church, Castlemartin, County Kildare, Doonagore Castle, County Clare, and Carragin Castle, County Galway where full restorations were completed. More details of these and other projects can be seen in his papers bequeathed to the Library of Trinity College, Dublin.

Percy Le Clerc was a founder member of the Irish Georgian Society, restarted by Desmond Guinness in 1957 in response to the demolition of buildings in Georgian squares close to the Office of Public Works at No. 10, Hume Street. Erika Hanna wrote in her book Modern Dublin, Urban Change and the Irish Past: "The quiet protest of Le Clerc (against his own organisation) was indicative of his dissatisfaction with the State's policies concerning the built environment." This same frustration at the neglect of Ireland's architectural heritage is described by Campbell Spray, the journalist, in his article Percy the Monument written when he was Editor of 'Social & Personal' magazine. However, Le Clerc's sheer love of life, Dublin social life in particular, shines through. His projects were never finished without a "Grand Opening Ceremony."
