= Alison Doody =

Irish actress and model (born 1966)

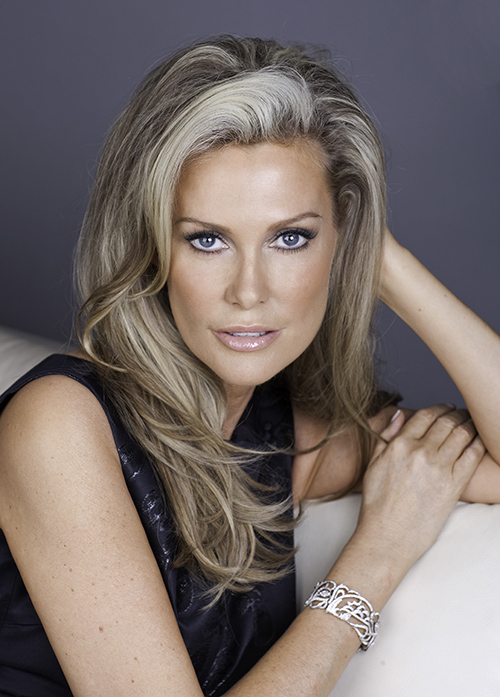
- Doody in 2009
- Born: 9 March 1966 (age 60); Dublin, Ireland
- Occupations: Actress, model
- Years active: 1984–present
- Spouse: Gavin O'Reilly (m. 1994; div. 2006)
- Partner(s): Douglas De Jager (2011–2012; his death); Tadhg Geary (e. 2014; sep. 2015)
- Children: 2

Alison Doody (born 9 March 1966) is an Irish actress and model. After making her feature film debut as Bond girl Jenny Flex in A View to a Kill (1985), she went on to play Elsa Schneider in Indiana Jones and the Last Crusade (1989). Other roles include Siobhan Donavan in A Prayer for the Dying (1987), Caroline Nolan in Echoes (1988), Charlotte in Taffin (1988), Rebecca Flannery in Major League II (1994) and Catherine Buxton in RRR (2022). She also played Pam in Beaver Falls (2011–2012).

== Early life ==
The youngest of three children, Doody was born in Dublin, Ireland. Her mother, Joan, was a beauty therapist, and her father, Patrick, worked in the property business and farmed. Doody attended Mount Anville Secondary School.

== Career ==
Approached by a photographer, Doody took up modeling, which turned into a commercial career. Doody avoided glamour and nude work, a point which she extended to her acting career.

Having come to the attention of the casting director of a new James Bond film, she accepted a small part as Jenny Flex in 1985's A View to a Kill. Doody was listed as one of 12 Promising New Actors of 1986 in John Willis' Screen World, Vol. 38. Still only 18 when she appeared in the role, Doody was – and remains – the youngest Bond girl to date. Another early appearance was as IRA member Siobhan Donovan in A Prayer for the Dying (1987), which starred Mickey Rourke.

Doody had a non-speaking role in the 1987 television adaptation of The Secret Garden appearing as Archibald Craven's wife, Lilias, in his dream. Her first lead role was in a 1988 episode of Jim Henson fantasy series The Storyteller as Sapsorrow, opposite John Hurt, Dawn French and Jennifer Saunders.

She played opposite Pierce Brosnan in the film Taffin (1988) before taking probably her most high-profile part to date, as Austrian Nazi-sympathiser and archaeologist Elsa Schneider in 1989's Indiana Jones and the Last Crusade playing opposite Harrison Ford. The film also starred Sean Connery as Indy's father; Doody has acted alongside three actors (Moore, Connery, and Brosnan) who have portrayed James Bond.

In 1991, Doody co-starred opposite Jonathan Pryce in mini-series Selling Hitler, inspired by the publishing fraud known as the Hitler Diaries. She subsequently relocated to Hollywood. Chosen to replace Cybill Shepherd as spokeswoman for L'Oréal, she went on to play opposite Charlie Sheen in 1994's Major League II as Flannery, his girlfriend and agent.

After almost a decade away from the screen, Doody returned to acting with a small role in 2003 film The Actors with Michael Caine, playing herself in an award ceremony scene. She played alongside Patrick Swayze in the 2004 television film King Solomon's Mines and also starred in a short called Benjamin's Struggle (2005), a pamphlet about the Holocaust, and in the TV series Waking the Dead (in a two-part episode called "The Fall"). In 2010, Doody shot a part in Danny Dyer's film The Rapture (2010). She later guest starred in RTÉ's medical drama The Clinic, and was set to star in a 2011 remake of horror classic The Asphyx, but the project later stalled.

In 2011, she began the first of two series on E4 comedy-drama Beaver Falls, playing Pam Jefferson. In 2014 she appeared in We Still Kill the Old Way.

On 21 November 2018, she received the "Almería, tierra de cine" award, and she received a star on Almeria Walk of Fame.

On 20 November 2019 she made her debut in the Indian film industry with the film RRR.

== Personal life ==
Doody married Gavin O'Reilly, CEO of the Independent News & Media, on 25 June 1994, at the O'Reilly family residence Castlemartin. The couple made their home at Bartra House, a 10,000-square-foot (930 m^{2}) home overlooking the sea in Dalkey; at the time of purchase, it was the most expensive house in Ireland. They had two daughters before separating in 2004 and divorcing in 2006.

During the 2011 filming of the comedy-drama Beaver Falls in South Africa, Doody met Douglas De Jager, a packaging tycoon from Cape Town. The couple had a low-key relationship before De Jager died of a heart attack in July 2012.

She was engaged to businessman Tadhg Geary from 2014 to 2015.

== Filmography ==
=== Film ===
Year	Title	Role(s)	Notes	Ref.
1985	A View to a Kill	Jenny Flex	Film Debut	
1987	A Prayer for the Dying	Siobhan Donovan		
1987	The Secret Garden	Mrs. Lilias Craven (dream; cameos)		
1988	Taffin	Charlotte		
1989	Indiana Jones and the Last Crusade	Elsa Schneider		
1991	Duel of Hearts	Lady Caroline Faye		
1992	Ring of the Musketeers	Ann-Marie Athos		
1994	Major League II	Rebecca Flannery		
1994	Temptation	Lee Reddick		
2003	The Actors	Herself		
2005	Benjamin's Struggle	Katrina Stockhausen	Short film	
2010	The Rapture	Professor Alison Hayes		
2011	Billy & Chuck	Mother	Short film	
2014	We Still Kill the Old Way	Susan Taylor		
2016	Brother	Grace		
2017	Division 19	Neilsen		
2019	The Rising Hawk	Rada		
2019	Muse	Grace		
2022	RRR	Lady Catherine Buxton	Indian film	

=== Television ===
Year	Title	Role	Notes	Ref(s)
1985	Deceptions	Waitress	Unknown episodes	
1986–1987	Howards' Way	Girl	Unknown episodes	
1987	Queenie	Bully	Episode: #1.1	
1987	Harry's Kingdom	Debbie	TV film	
1988	Campaign	Alessandra Castorina	All 6 episodes	
1988	Echoes	Caroline Nolan	3 episodes	
1988	The StoryTeller	Sapsorrow	Episode: "Sapsorrow"	
1989	The Jim Henson Hour	Sapsorrow	Episode: "Garbage"	
1989	Women in Tropical Places	Celia	TV film	
1991	Selling Hitler	Gina Heidemann	All 5 episodes	
2004	King Solomon's Mines	Elizabeth Maitland	All 2 episodes	
2007	Waking the Dead	Katherine Keane	”The Fall" Episodes 6.5 & 6.6	
2009	The Clinic	Lucille	4 episodes	
2011–2012	Beaver Falls	Pamela Jefferson	All 12 episodes	

=== Non-acting television ===
Year	Title	Role	Notes	Ref(s)
1990	Wogan	Herself	Series 9	
2003	Entertainment Tonight	Herself		
2003	1st Irish Film & Television Awards	Presenter	TV special	
2004	2nd Irish Film & Television Awards	Presenter	TV special	
2006	The Hollywood Greats	Presenter	Series 7 with Harrison Ford	
2008	Indy's Women: The American Film Institute Tribute	Herself		
2008	Xposé	Herself	Season 3 Episode 16	
2009	The Late Late Show	Herself		
2010	7th Irish Film & Television Awards	Presenter	TV special	

=== Documentaries ===
Year	Title	Role	Notes	Ref(s)
2003	Indiana Jones: Making the Trilogy	Herself		
2004	Happy Birthday Oscar Wilde	Herself		
