= Landis+Gyr =

Multinational electronics corporation

Landis+Gyr Group AG
- Type: Publicly traded limited company
- Traded as: SIX: LAND
- Industry: Electronics
- Founded: 1896; 130 years ago in Zug, Switzerland
- Founder: Richard Theiler; Adelrich Gyr
- Headquarters: Cham (ZG), Switzerland
- Area served: Worldwide
- Key people: Audrey Zibelman (Chairman); Peter Mainz (CEO)
- Products: Energy meters; Heat meters; Gas meters; Smart meters; Smart grid solutions
- Revenue: US $1.4 Billion
- Number of employees: 6,900
- Website: www.landisgyr.com

Landis+Gyr Group AG, formerly known as Bayard Group, is a publicly listed, multinational corporation operating in over 30 countries and headquartered in Cham, Switzerland. Landis+Gyr makes meters and related software for electricity, gas and water utilities.

== History ==
Landis+Gyr was founded in 1896 as Theiler & Co. in Zug, in the canton of Zug, Switzerland, by technician Richard Theiler and entrepreneur Adelrich Gyr. It began by manufacturing electricity meters that were developed by Theiler. Heinrich Landis joined the business in 1903, acquired it in 1904 and introduced Karl Heinrich Gyr as a partner in 1905, renaming it Landis & Gyr. The company benefited from the rise of the electrical industry and expanded abroad over the following years. By 1914, when it was made a joint-stock company, it was the largest employer in the canton of Zug, with over 800 employees.

In the 1920s, Landis & Gyr opened offices in New York City and Australia and took over competitors to form a global technology group. From the 1930s, the company diversified with telemetry and remote control products. After leadership struggles in the 1950s, a new management reorganized the financing and accounting and converted Landis & Gyr into a holding company. The range was expanded to include service machines, air conditioning and ventilation products. Landis & Gyr increased its personnel, with 14,000 employees around 1970 (5,200 of them in Zug).

From the mid-1970s and especially after 1984, the group was frequently restructured. In 1987, Landis & Gyr was acquired by Stephan Schmidheiny, who sold it to Elektrowatt in 1995. It is today a part of Siemens Building Technologies. The company was also known for producing optical phone cards until 2006. Landis+Gyr phone cards were used in many countries such as Israel, Belgium, Switzerland and more.

In April 2026, Landis+Gyr completed the divestiture of its Europe, Middle East and Africa (EMEA) business to the private equity firm AURELIUS. The US$215 million transaction, which had been announced in September 2025, closed with economic effect as of 31 March 2026 following regulatory approvals. As part of the transaction, AURELIUS acquired Landis+Gyr’s full EMEA metering portfolio across electricity, gas, thermal and water, including associated software and services, five production sites and approximately 2,800 employees.

Following the divestiture, Landis+Gyr stated that it would sharpen its strategic focus on the Americas and Asia‑Pacific regions, particularly in higher‑value software, services and grid‑edge intelligence solutions.

=== Ownership and acquisitions ===
- 1976 – Landis+Gyr acquired Duncan Electric Company of Lafayette, Indiana.
- 1987 – Landis+Gyr acquired MCC Powers of Chicago. MCC Powers had by then been a long established entity in the US building management market. Spurred by the liberalization and deregulation of global markets, Landis+Gyr re-oriented its business, adding electronic products.
- Late 1990s – In the late 1990s, Landis+Gyr went through a series of different investors and owners, amongst them Elektrowatt, KKR and Siemens.
- 2004 – Landis+Gyr was acquired by then Australia-based Bayard Capital for an undisclosed amount. Bayard Capital had already acquired the British metering company Ampy Automation-Digilog. As Bayard Capital continued to add other acquisitions to the group, 2008 saw the Landis+Gyr name being extended to the whole group in May 2008. An organizational realignment took place under Bayard Capital's ownership. The company moved to a regional structure, assigning regional corporate structures for North America; South America; UK/Pre-Payment; Europe; and Asia Pacific.
- 2006 – Landis+Gyr acquired Finnish Enermet Group, and also Hunt Technologies and Cellnet Technologies, both of which are from the United States.
- 2011 – Landis+Gyr was acquired by Toshiba Corporation of Japan for US$2.3 billion.
- 2017 – On July 21, 2017, Landis+Gyr listed its shares (ticker symbol: LAND) on the SIX Swiss Exchange.
- 2026 - On March 31, 2026, Landis+Gyr divested its EMEA business to AURELIUS for US$215 million.

== Utilities ==
Various utilities have worked with Landis+Gyr in meeting their consumers' demand for energy management tools by rolling out smart meters. Below are some of the utilities that have worked with Landis+Gyr in deploying smart metering technology to energy consumers.

- Europe, Middle East & Africa: British Gas; Iberdrola; Électricité Réseau Distribution France (ERDF); E.ON; Järvi-Suomen Energia Oy; Vattenfall; Eskom; RWE.
- Asia Pacific: Energex; Ergon Energy; Ausgrid; Essential Energy; Western Power; ESTA; Genesis Energy Limited; Meralco; China Light & Power; Singapore Power.
- North America: Oncor Energy; Pacific Gas and Electric; Hydro-Québec; AEP Texas.
- South America: Copel; AES Eletropaulo; Ampla – Enel/ENDESA Group; Light; CEMIG; National Electricity Administration, Paraguay (ANDE); Cooperativa Regional de Electricidad, Bolivia (CRE); EDESUR - Enel/ENDESA Group (Argentina); CODENSA – Enel/ENDESA Group (Colombia).

== Criticism ==
- In 2016, Phil Mocek of MuckRock started investigating a project in which Landis+Gyr was involved. After Mocek received the requested information, Landis+Gyr followed up by filing a lawsuit demanding the documentation not be made public.
