= Castlemartin House and Estate =

Historic property in County Kildare, Ireland

Coordinates: 53.1358°N 6.751667°W

Castlemartin House
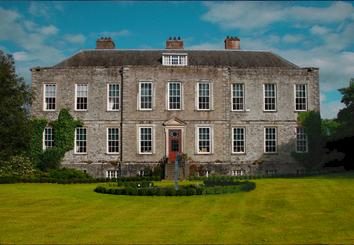

- Location within Ireland

General information
- Status: Private dwelling house
- Type: House
- Architectural style: Georgian
- Location: County Kildare, Ireland, Ireland
- Estimated completion: 1720

Technical details
- Floor count: 3

Design and construction
- Developer: Francis Harrison MP

Castlemartin is the name of a historic house and estate, and the townland in which they sit, on the banks of the River Liffey in Kilcullen, County Kildare, Ireland. Formerly a key estate of the Eustace family, it was for many years the home of media magnate Tony O'Reilly, and his wife, Chryss Goulandris, but was bought in 2015 by John Malone, an Irish American. The estate includes major stud farm and cattle breeding operations, a restored medieval church and an icehouse.

== Location and access ==
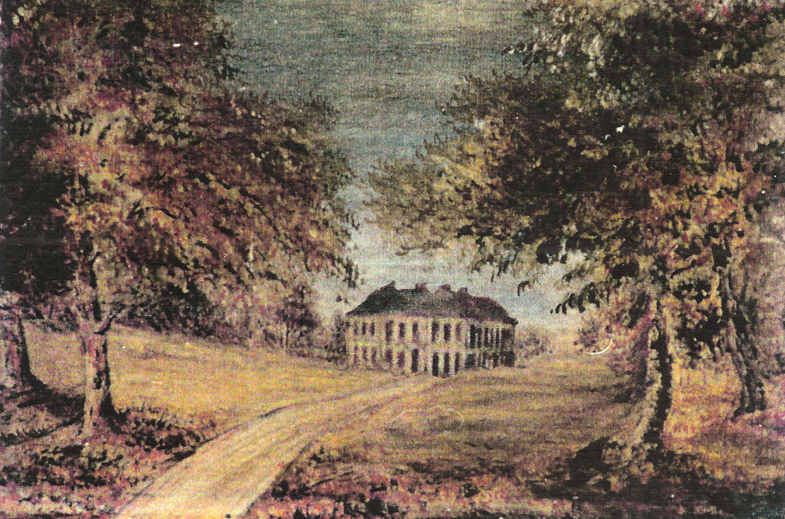
Castle Martin from the park, a watercolour by Lady Fanny Carter

The estate lies immediately adjacent to the town, to the west, and largely west of the River Liffey, though a small part of the land has for centuries lain east of the river, above Kilcullen Heritage Centre and town hall/theatre/cinema. Accesses to the main body of the estate, secured with gates and cameras, are from Newbridge Road, on the approach to Kilcullen from the Curragh. The estate is bounded on one side by the Pinkeen Stream, a tributary of the Liffey, and the "Laurel Walk Woods."

There is no general access to the estate lands. This includes, despite promises at the time of restoration, to St. Mary's Church (Castlemartin Chapel). Neither Castlermartin House nor the church can now be seen from the public roads, though the house is said to have a river view. The access issue was a factor in local opposition to an offer by O'Reilly to take the "Portlester Monument" into the estate; its subject, Rowland FitzEustace, 1st Baron Portlester, had lived at Castlemartin in the 15th century.

== Elements ==
The estate includes the main house, St Mary's Church, extensive lands of good quality, and a number of other houses including Brownstone Cottage. The redevelopment and design of the estate by the O'Reillys included the use of a standard teal colour for key features.

=== Castlemartin House ===
Castlemartin House, in its current form a restored 18th-century mansion, has more than 50 rooms, of which 27 are main rooms, is the successor to a series of older dwellings, perhaps dating back to the 13th century. With a total area of 2428 sq. metres, the house has a master suite, 5 en-suite bedrooms and 4 other bedrooms, and a staff flat, as well as a range of reception rooms, a library, cellars and many service rooms.

Key occupants have included members of the Eustace family, and later the Carter family.

The house is located close to the Liffey and is reached from the main gates by way of a lime avenue, with two trees joining to form an arch at one point.

==== Ancillary facilities ====
There is a pool house, an outdoor swimming pool, a tennis court, a summer house, guest and staff housing, a conference facility, offices for the estate manager, stud manager, farm manager and security team, and many outbuildings.

=== Roads and Bridge ===
The estate has an extensive network of internal roads, and a private bridge across the River Liffey, Castlemartin Bridge. There is also an internal water distribution network, bringing fresh water to each paddock.

=== Historic Features ===
==== Castlemartin Castle ====
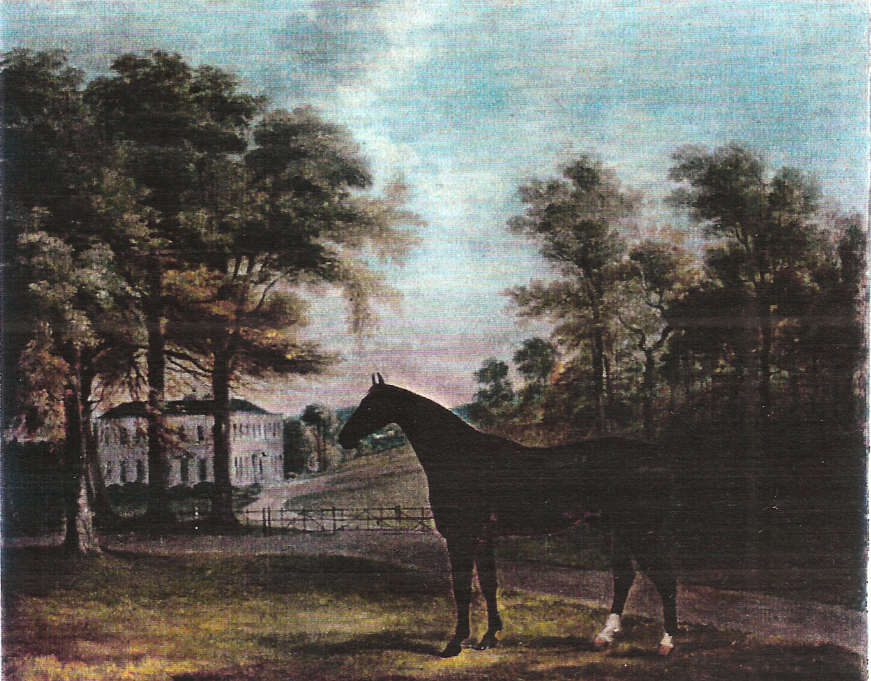
A horse in a landscape with Castle Martin in the background. The property was occupied by the Carter family from 1730 to 1850.

Preceding the house was a fortified dwelling. Little trace of this now remains, but a vault from it is believed to still exist in the basement of, and otherwise under, the current Castlemartin House.

==== Icehouse ====
Near the house and restored in the same period (1980 / 1981) as the church is a sunken icehouse with an elaborate stone entrance, with stairs curving down from both sides. The interior is a plain inverted beehive, with a drain at the bottom.

==== St Mary's Church ====
The church (sometimes, incorrectly, called "Castlemartin Chapel"), founded c. 1200, was a dependency of Kilcullen Church (at what is now Old Kilcullen), founded c. 1200. The building was last substantially reconstructed in the 15th century (around 1490). Having fallen into ruin, St. Mary's was restored by Tony O'Reilly between 1979 and 1980, under the supervision of former Inspector of National Monuments Percy Le Clerc. This, the first restoration of a medieval church in Ireland, was authorised on the basis of close adherence to original forms and ongoing reasonable public access. As the religious status of the church was no longer clear, it was reconsecrated in 1981. At least two of Tony O'Reilly's children have married in the church, and his mother's funeral was held here.

==== Gate Lodge and Grand Gate ====
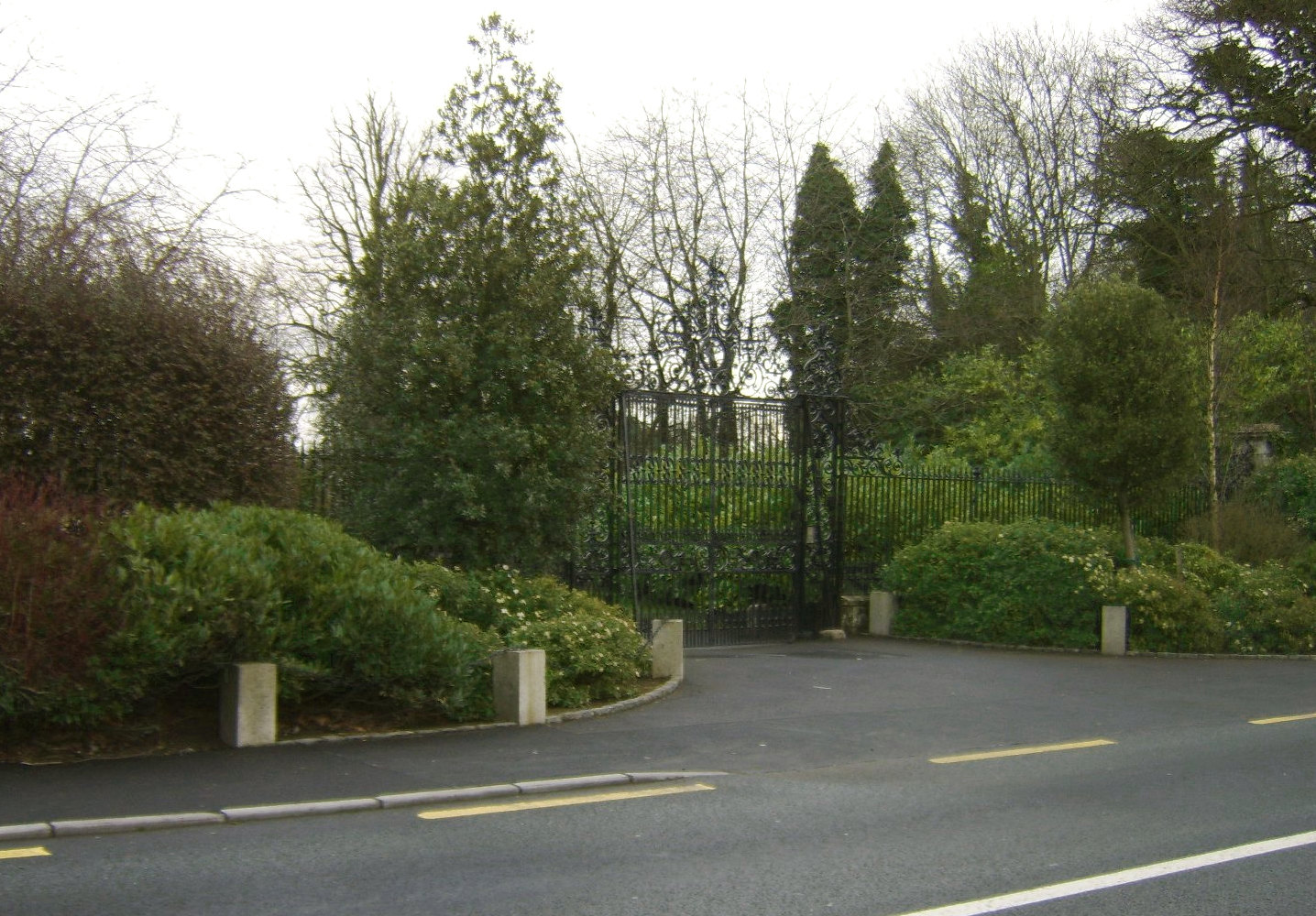
The main entrance to Castlemartin Estate, on the Newbridge Road out from Kilcullen

The one-storey gate lodge dates from the 1820s, and was renovated around 1980. It features a pyramidal profile roof with slate, clay ridge tiles and a rendered chimney stack, as well as square-headed window openings and timber casement windows.

The adjacent Grand Gate, a pair of decorative wrought iron open-work piers with cresting and iron double main gates with decorative panels and pedestrian gates, dates from c. 1750. In the National Inventory of Architectural Heritage it is described as follows:

This gateway, possibly originally fashioned for installment at alternative location, is an attractive, highly ornate composition that provides a fitting entrance to the Castlemartin (House) estate. The gateway forms part of a self-contained group with the gate lodge to north-west. The piers, gates and railings are fine examples of early surviving wrought iron work and include intricate detailing, which is of artistic interest. The gateway is a prominent and attractive feature on the side of the road leading out of Kilcullen to the west.

=== Lands ===
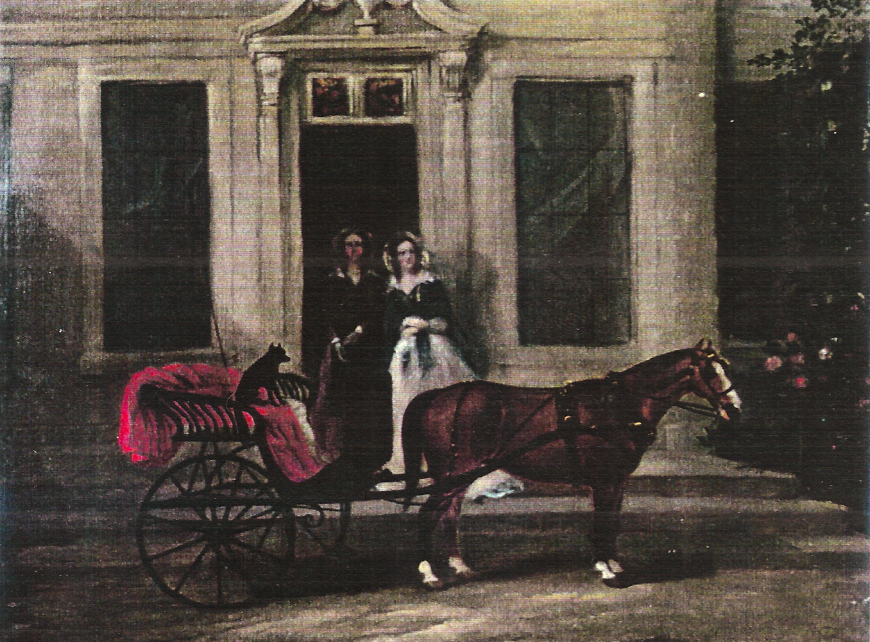
Two ladies of the Carter family in the doorway of Castlemartin. Their horse and carriage and a small dog are seen waiting.

The estate lands of around 750 acres (3.0 km^{2}) are a mix of parkland and working areas, crossed by avenues and watercourses. Both a stud farm, Castlemartin Stud, and a cattle breeding operation, Castlemartin Charolais Herd, are present, with two farm yards, as well as gardens designed by Lanning Roper. Some Irish donkeys are also resident. There are many rose plantations, and some outstanding trees, including a Monkey Puzzle tree.

Since the 1830s, a new main avenue has been made, though traces of the old remain, and much of the historic woodland has been removed, notably around the main house.

Entries in the National Inventory of Architectural Heritage for Castlemartin note the survival of sections of wrought iron railings from around 1830, on rubble stone boundary walls.

In addition to the boundary Pinkeen Stream, there are a number of artificial water channels on the land.

==== Castlemartin Stud ====
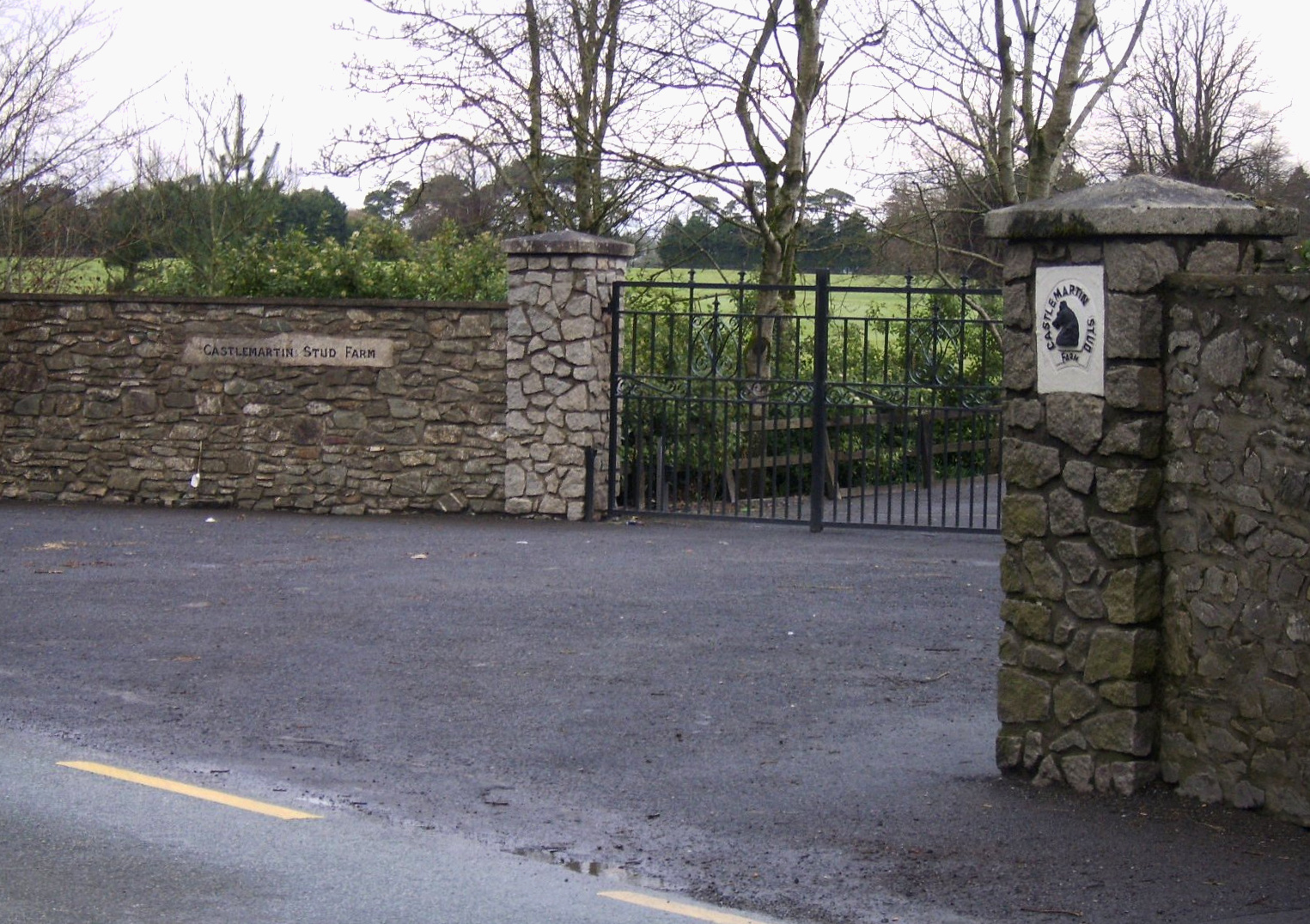
The entrance to Castlemartin Stud, on the Newbridge Road out from Kilcullen

Stud facilities include two stable yards, 89 loose boxes, a horse walker and a lunge ring.

Under O'Reilly ownership, the stud farm was part of a structure which held animals locally as well as in France, England, Australia, South Africa and the US, had 155 broodmares (at three locations) and 105 horses in training at the beginning of 2008. The Stud raced horses in the colours of Belvedere College and of Lady O'Reilly's Skymarc Farm (France).

==== Castlemartin Herd ====
The Charolais herd, founded in 1976, includes 325 cattle, of which 3 are stock bulls and 125 breeding cows

== History ==
A branch of the Eustace family, of Barretstown Castle, Ballymore Eustace, and of Harristown, held Castlemartin from the 13th century. This "Old English" family, once one of the most prominent in Kildare, had intermarried with other Norman families such as the Talbots of Malahide and the Plunketts of Dunsany (twice). Castlemartin belonged to a Eustace widow who remarried to Captain Thomas Lee in about 1580. In 1591 the castle burnt down "by the means of lewd servants", according to Lee. The property reverted to the Eustaces, and was the favourite home of Sir Maurice Eustace (d. 1665), Lord Chancellor of Ireland from the 1660 Restoration. He had no children, but his nephew inherited the estate.

=== The Modern House ===
Carter of Castle Martin crest badge on Irish saffron Motto: Patience is victorious in hardship.

In its current form, Castlemartin was built by a Dublin banker and member of parliament, Francis Harrison, in 1720. It is said stone from earlier constructions was reused in the process. About 1730 the house was sold to Thomas Carter M.P., father of Captain Henry Boyle Carter.

As noted, the house was commandeered during the 1798 rebellion as the headquarters of Ralph Dundas, and the interior was badly damaged.

In 1837, it was described as follows:

Castle-Martin, the elegant residence of W. H. Carter, Esq., occupies the site of the ancient castle of the Fitz-Martins, near Kilcullen-Bridge: the present mansion was occupied by the king's troops as a barrack, in 1798; it is surrounded with a highly improved and richly wooded demesne

Castlemartin was sold to a T. Blacker in 1854, and in the 1890s was in the hands of Major Blacker. In 1967, Sheelagh Blacker, the widow of Lt. Col. Frederick Blacker, left the house to her great nephew, Grey Gowrie. Already in poor condition, it deteriorated further in the following years.

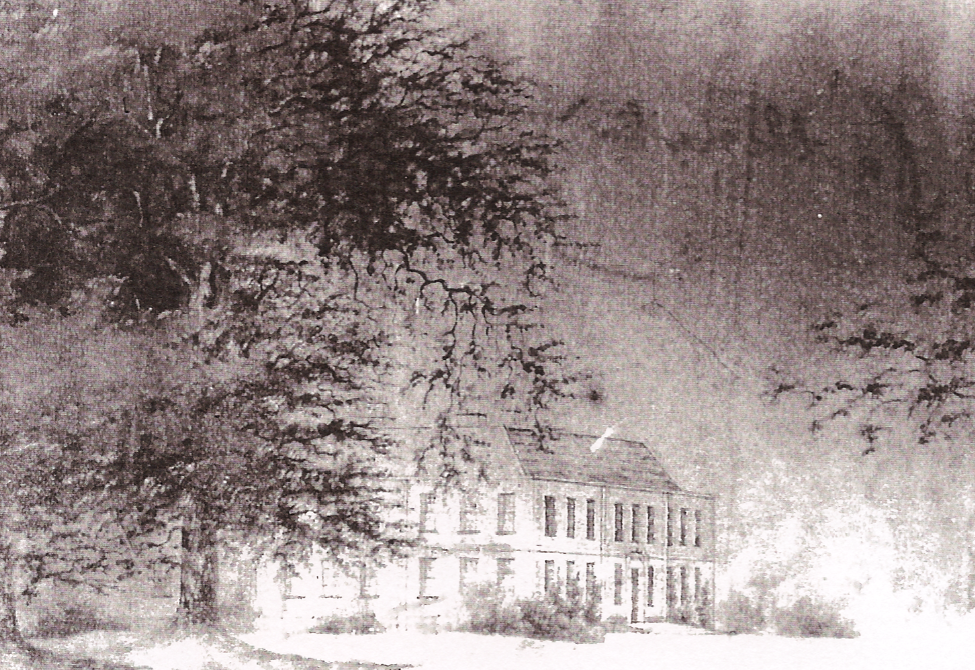
Castle Martin in the snow.

=== The O'Reilly family ===
In 1972, Lord Gowrie sold the estate to Dr. Anthony O'Reilly. At the time the sale was made, it was said that the estate was of value but that the house was probably only worth demolishing and replacing. O'Reilly, however, spent millions of pounds on repairs and improvements to the Georgian house and its outbuildings, and on the restoration of the estate church, icehouse and other features.

Castlemartin was the principal home for O'Reilly and his family for some years, sharing this role with a home near Pittsburgh, and when he became tax-resident in the Bahamas, was the second home for himself and his wife, Chryss Goulandris, and the place where the whole O'Reilly family gathered for Christmas.

=== Sale ===
Due to financial pressures, a brochure for the Estate was prepared in late 2014, and it was offered for sale internationally. It was sold to John C. Malone, billionaire owner of Liberty Media, with the agreement made in December 2014, and closure in January 2015 for around 28 million euro. In 2025, Malone stated in an interview that he had declined an offer from Facebook billionaire Mark Zuckerberg to purchase Castlemartin.

== Sources ==
- Dublin, Ireland: National Inventory of Architectural Heritage, entries including 11819040 and 11819041; although the core of the NIAH is filing, much is also published in County Books, and an amount available online, including at least five references to Castlemartin Estate (four under "Buildings" and one under "Gardens", although there was no formal or walled garden.)
- Dublin, 1752: "The County of Kildare", J. Noble and J. Keenan – Castlemartin Demesne shown.
- London, 1783: "A Map of The County of Kildare", A. Taylor, Lieut., His Majesty's 81st Regiment, London, 1783 (republished by the Royal Irish Academy, Dublin, 1983).
- Dublin, 1838: Ordnance Survey Maps – estate boundaries, main house and church ruins shown.
