= Gavin O'Reilly =

Irish businessman (born 1966)

- Born: Gavin Karl O'Reilly; 17 December 1966 (age 59); Dublin, Ireland
- Occupation: Business executive
- Spouses: Alison Doody (m. 1994; div. 2006) Christina Grimm (m. 2012)
- Children: 4
- Father: Tony O'Reilly

Gavin Karl O'Reilly (born 17 December 1966) is an Irish-Australian businessman known for his roles in media and consulting.

== Early life ==
O'Reilly is the eldest of triplets and the fourth of six children, the son of businessman Sir Tony O'Reilly and Susan O'Reilly (née Cameron). He was born in Dublin and raised in Fox Chapel, Pittsburgh, and Dublin. He attended Harrow School and Clongowes Wood before completing his Leaving Certificate exams in 1985. He then worked at the London advertising agency Doyle Dane Bernbach for two years before studying at Georgetown University School of Business.

== Career ==
=== INM ===
O'Reilly joined Independent News and Media plc (INM) in 1993, where he managed the "yellow page" division, Independent Directory. He was appointed CEO of INM's Irish operations in 1999 and later became Group COO in December 2001. He was also appointed to the board of directors in 2004 and served as Chairman of APN News & Media from 2008 to 2012. In 2005, he oversaw INM's investment in Jagran Prakashan Limited (JPL) and served on the board of JPL from 2006 to 2014. After his father's retirement in 2009, O'Reilly became Group CEO of INM and stepped down in April 2012.

=== Other roles ===
O'Reilly was president of the World Association of Newspapers (WAN) from 2005 to 2011, including during the merger with IFRA to form the World Association of Newspapers and News Publishers. He was elected as the first president of the merged association.

In 2013, he became Group CEO of The Agency Group Limited (now UTA Music). He has also been a director at Bayard Capital LLC and served as executive chairman of Red Flag Consulting and chairman of Wemersive, a VR software company. He invested in and chaired Agate Systems Ltd in 2018.

O'Reilly is a founding member of United Europe, a non-profit association established in 2013.

On 1 February 2021, he became chairman of The New European Limited.

== Former roles ==
He has also held positions as chairman of the National Newspapers of Ireland, BM Polyco, and Dromoland Castle Holdings Limited, and as a director of Norkom Technologies PLC, TVC PLC, PT Mahaka Media TBK, Ashford Castle Hotel, Cashcade Ltd., iTouch PLC, and the Irish Heart Foundation. He was also a founding director of Barretstown Gang Camp in Ireland.

== Personal life ==
O'Reilly married model and actress Alison Doody on 25 June 1994. They lived at Bartra House, Dalkey, and had two daughters before separating in 2004 and divorcing in 2006.

In 2012, O'Reilly married the Danish Christina Grimm. They have two children and now live in France.
