= The American Ireland Fund =

American tax-exempt organization

- Formation: 1976
- Type: Non-governmental organisation
- Purpose: Peace and reconciliation, community development, education, and arts and culture
- Headquarters: Boston, Massachusetts
- Chairman: Eugene M. McQuade
- President and CEO: Caitriona Fottrell
- Website: irelandfunds.org/

The American Ireland Fund (DBA The Ireland Funds America), is a tax-exempt organization incorporated under the laws of the United States and has been determined by the IRS to be a public charity under section 501(c)(3) of the Internal Revenue Code, tax ID # is 25-1306992. The organization raises funds for the support of peace and reconciliation, community development, education, and arts and culture in Ireland. Collectively with The Ireland Funds’ 12 worldwide chapters, it has raised more than $750 million (US), benefiting more than 3,000 Irish charities.

== History ==
In 1976, Tony O'Reilly, former CEO of H.J. Heinz Co., created The Ireland Fund with friend and fellow Pittsburgh businessman Dan Rooney, who later served as the United States Ambassador to Ireland. With three goals, "Peace, Culture and Charity", The Ireland Funds appealed for support for Ireland and its people from all Americans, especially those of Irish descent. Rooney himself stated it was established to counter the prominent militant NORAID (Irish Northern Aid Committee), which was routinely accused of using donations to purchase weapons for the IRA. He stated it wasn't easy at first to persuade the American public already outraged at IRA atrocities to donate to the Funds: "[W]e often had to explain that we were not raising money for bombs."

In 1978, the New York Times reported the Ireland Fund had sent $500,000 to Ireland in its four years.

On St. Patrick's Day 1987, The Ireland Fund and the American Irish Foundation led by Arthur William Bourn Vincent merged at a White House ceremony to form The American Ireland Fund. In 1988, O' Reily declared to The New York Times that the Ireland Fund was raising $4 million per year. By July 1993, the group was raising $6 million annually, holding 24 events in 12 American cities. This amount was in stark contrast to NORAID's $3.6 million donations from 1970 to 1998 and equal to the IRA's annual $2-10 million derived from criminal and legitimate activities across Ireland in the 1970s-1990s.

== Operations ==
As of June 2025, The American Ireland Fund list the following fundraising chapters across the United States: Boston, Chicago, Naples, Florida, Palm Beach, New York City, New Jersey, Pittsburgh, San Francisco, Texas, and Washington D.C.

The American Ireland Fund donated between $500,000 and $1 million to the Clinton Foundation.

The Irish Times reported that the organization gave $15.7 million to such Irish organizations in 2012. The organization's net revenue amounted to more than $20 million in both 2011 and 2012.

The headquarters of The Ireland Funds America is in Boston, Massachusetts. The organization shares its headquarters with parent The Ireland Funds.

== The Ireland Funds ==
The American Ireland Fund is part of a global organization known as The Ireland Funds. As of June 2025, The Ireland Funds list operations in 12 countries with worldwide membership chapters: Australia, Canada, China, France, Germany, Great Britain, Ireland, Japan, Monaco, New Zealand, and Singapore.
