= Trojan Battery Company =

United States battery manufacturing company

- Founded: 1925; 101 years ago
- Founders: George Godber; Carl Speer
- Website: www.trojanbattery.com

Trojan Battery Company is a manufacturer of deep-cycle motive power batteries. With Rick Heller as CEO in 2024, the company produces flooded lead acid batteries, absorbent glass mat (AGM) batteries, lithium-ion batteries, and related battery accessories.

Motive power batteries are used in golf carts, low speed electric vehicles and utility vehicles, aerial work platforms and industrial material handling equipment, floor cleaning machines and janitorial/sanitation equipment, solar and renewable energy storage, as well as marine and boating, recreational vehicles, transportation and trucking.

== Products ==
Trojan Battery Company manufactures 2V, 6V, 8V, 12V, 24V, 36V, and 48V batteries under the Trojan brand. Battery types include flooded lead acid batteries, Trojan AES absorbent glass mat (AGM) batteries, and lithium-ion batteries.

In 2022, Trojan Battery Company released lithium-ion batteries in 24V, 36V, and 48V GC2 BCI sizes. In 2023, the company introduced Trojan AES AGM batteries. The Trojan AES AGM Battery launch was recently followed by the release of two DIN (Deutsches Institut für Normung) size models for the European market. In 2024, Trojan released the Trojan OnePack, a 48V, 105Ah single pack battery specially designed for golf cart and LSV applications.

== History ==
Trojan Battery Company was founded by George Godber and Carl Speer in 1925. The Trojan name and logo was inspired by University of Southern California Trojans football team.

Godber started Trojan Battery in the Los Angeles area with his brother-in-law, Carl Speer. They began manufacturing automotive batteries before moving to batteries for commercial trucks and eventually focused on deep-cycle batteries. In 1952, Trojan Battery began a partnership with golf cart manufacturer Autoette to design a vehicle for a physically challenged golfer, leading to the first battery designed for electric golf carts.

In the 1960s and 1970s, Trojan Battery moved to Santa Fe Springs in Southern California. During this time, it expanded its batteries for floor machines, marine and boats, and construction and industrial equipment.

In the 1980s and 1990s, Trojan Battery Company opened a manufacturing facility in Atlanta, Georgia. In 1992, it built a Technology Center in its Santa Fe Springs facility for the purpose of "advancing product design and development."

In 2009, Trojan Battery launched a renewable energy division. In 2018, Trojan Battery Company was acquired by C&D Technologies, a portfolio company of KPS Capital Partners.

On October 1, 2026, it was announced that Stryten Energy had completed the acquisition of Trojan Battery and C&D Technologies.
