= Waterford Wedgwood =

Former Irish crystal and porcelain business

Waterford Wedgwood plc
- Type: Public limited company
- Industry: Household goods
- Founded: 1987
- Defunct: 2009
- Fate: Assets purchased by KPS Capital Partners
- Successor: WWRD Holdings Limited
- Headquarters: Waterford, Ireland
- Key people: Tony O'Reilly (lead shareholder; chairman 1995–2009); Peter Goulandris
- Products: Ceramics and glass items
- Subsidiaries: Waterford Crystal; Wedgwood; Rosenthal; Royal Doulton; Cashs of Ireland

Waterford Wedgwood plc was an Irish holding company for a group of firms that specialized in the manufacture of high-quality porcelain, bone china and glass products, mostly for use as tableware or home decor. The group was dominated by Irish businessman Tony O'Reilly and his family, including his wife Chryss Goulandris and her family, with the two families together having invested hundreds of millions of euros in it. The group's financial record was mixed, and significant cost-cutting had been ongoing for many years.

In 2009, parts of the group, including the main Irish and UK operations, were placed into receivership and acquired by KPS Capital Partners, a New York–based private equity firm. Waterford Crystal and Wedgwood, along with Royal Doulton and other brands, were transferred to a new company named WWRD Holdings Limited (with WWRD as an acronym for 'Waterford Wedgwood Royal Doulton'). In July 2015, WWRD Holdings was acquired by Fiskars, a Finnish consumer goods company.

== History ==
The company was founded in 1987 through the merger of Waterford Crystal and Wedgwood, to create an Ireland-based luxury brands group. The firm traced its heritage to the 1780s. The group's constituent companies were Waterford Crystal, with brands including Waterford, Marquis by Waterford and a number of Waterford-designer cooperations, Wedgwood (Josiah Wedgwood and Sons), with the range of Wedgwood brands, and English Royal Doulton. The group also licensed its brands to other companies.

Private investment company Oak Point Partners acquired the remnant assets, consisting of any known and unknown assets that weren't previously administered, from the Waterford Wedgwood USA, Inc., et al., Bankruptcy Estates on 8 December 2017.

=== Receivership ===
Sales for the year to 5 April 2008 were €671.8 million, down 9.4% year-on-year. Losses were €231.1 million, up from €71.3 million in the previous year. On 2 April 2008, the CEO, Peter Cameron (previously COO, and prior to that CEO of acquisition All-Clad), resigned, and was replaced by David Sculley. Operational costs were reduced, with around 4,000 jobs removed or in the process of being removed between early 2005 and late 2008. In October 2008, the shares fell to .001 euro cent. Following the failure of the 2008 share issue and the subsequent defaulting of bank covenants by the company in December 2008, Tony O'Reilly Jr stated in January 2009 that the company was in advanced negotiations with a US private equity company concerning a rescue package, which would result in the bulk of the company's production moving away from the UK and Ireland to Indonesia (where the company already has some production facilities. On 5 January 2009, David Sculley, chief executive officer of Waterford Wedgwood PLC, announced that Waterford Wedgwood had been put into receivership after the heavily indebted firm had failed to find a buyer. Union members organized and occupied the Dublin offices lobby and the Kilbarry Plant protesting the withdrawal of credit lines by The Bank of America and threatened 480 redundancies. Their aim, according to blogger, Fiona Harrington "to either have the company nationalised, or to maintain it as a going concern until a buyer can be found."

On 27 February 2009, Waterford Wedgwood's receiver, David Carson of Deloitte, announced that the New York–based private equity firm KPS Capital Partners had purchased "certain Irish and UK assets of Waterford Wedgwood and the assets of several of its Irish and UK subsidiaries." 176 out of the threatened 480 jobs were saved, although the deal did not include the Waterford site. Its US business filed for Chapter 7 bankruptcy liquidation in April 2009.

=== Former directors ===
Following the resignations on 5 January 2009 of the chairman, Senior Independent Director, Lady O'Reilly and a former CEO, and of further directors on the 8th and 9th, and the departure of John Foley, the Board of Directors comprises the below. All resigning directors have also resigned from subsidiary boards.

- Peter Goulandris, Deputy Chairman
- David W. Sculley, Group CEO from 1 August 2008, Interim Group CEO (from 2 April 2008), partner in a New York investment firm
- Anthony Jones, CFO (from November 2007)
- Mark Downie, Company Secretary
- Lord Wedgwood
- Jonathan (Jon) H. Kagan (Lazard)
- Ali E. Wambold (Lazard)

Up to 5 January 2009, the Board of Directors comprised the below, many having served for a decade or more:

- Sir Anthony (Tony) O'Reilly, Chairman
- Peter Goulandris, Deputy Chairman
- Lady Chryss O'Reilly (née Goulandris)
- David W. Sculley, Group CEO from 1 August 2008, Interim Group CEO (from 2 April 2008), partner in a New York investment firm
- Anthony Jones, CFO (from November 2007)
- Mark Downie, Company Secretary
- Dr. F. Alan Wedgwood
- Lord Wedgwood
- John Foley, CEO of Waterford Crystal
- Kevin McGoran, Chairman of Waterford Crystal and Fitzwilton plc
- Ottmar C. Kusel, CEO of Rosenthal AG
- (P.) Redmond O'Donogue, Group CEO until 31 August 2005
- Patrick J Molloy, senior independent director
- Jonathan (Jon) H. Kagan (Lazard)
- Ali E. Wambold (Lazard)

=== WWRD Holdings Limited ===
On 5 January 2009, following years of financial problems at the group level, and after a share placement failed during the 2008 financial crisis, Waterford Wedgwood was placed into administration on a "going concern" basis, with 1800 employees remaining. On 27 February 2009, Waterford Wedgwood's receiver, Deloitte, announced that the New York–based private equity firm KPS Capital Partners had purchased "certain Irish and UK assets of Waterford Wedgwood and the assets of several of its Irish and UK subsidiaries" in a transaction expected to be completed in March. KPS Capital Partners placed Wedgwood into a group of companies known as WWRD, an acronym for "Waterford Wedgwood Royal Doulton".

In May 2015, Fiskars, a Finnish maker of home products, agreed to buy 100% of the holdings of WWRD. On 2 July 2015, the acquisition of WWRD by Fiskars Corporation was completed, including the brands Waterford, Wedgwood, Royal Doulton, Royal Albert and Rogaška. The acquisition was approved by the US antitrust authorities.
