= Club car =

Club car may refer to:

- Club Car, an American company that manufactures electric and gas-powered golf cars and utility vehicles
- Bar car, a train car that has as its primary purpose the provision and consumption of alcoholic and other beverages
- Lounge car, a train car where riders can purchase food and drinks
- Parlor car, a type of rail passenger coach that provides superior comforts and amenities
