= Waterford Crystal =

Manufacturer of crystal glassware

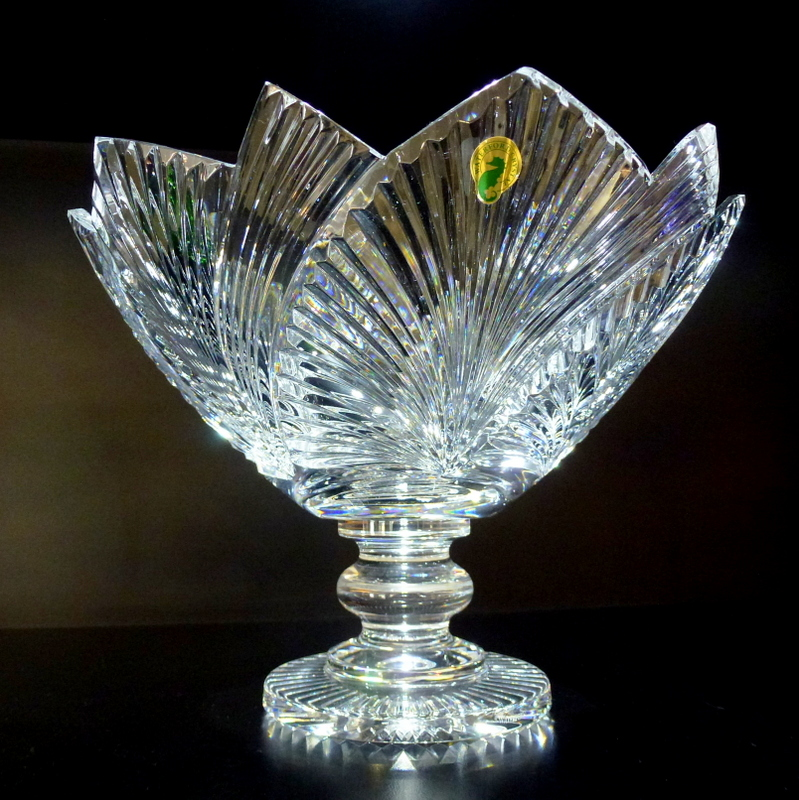
- A cut glass vase by Waterford
- Type: Subsidiary
- Industry: Glass production
- Founded: 1947; 79 years ago
- Products: Glassware
- Parent: Fiskars Corporation
- Website: www.waterford.com/en-us

Waterford Crystal is an Irish manufacturer of crystal glassware, especially cut glass products. It is named after the city of Waterford in Ireland. In January 2009, the main Waterford Crystal manufacturing base on the edge of Waterford was closed due to the insolvency of Waterford Wedgwood plc, and in June 2010, Waterford Crystal relocated almost back to the roots of glass-making in the city centre. The Mall location holds both a manufacturing facility that melts over 750 tonnes of crystal a year – although most Waterford Crystal is now produced outside Ireland – and a visitor centre with the world's largest collection of Waterford Crystal. Since 2015, the brand has been owned by Fiskars Corporation.

== History ==
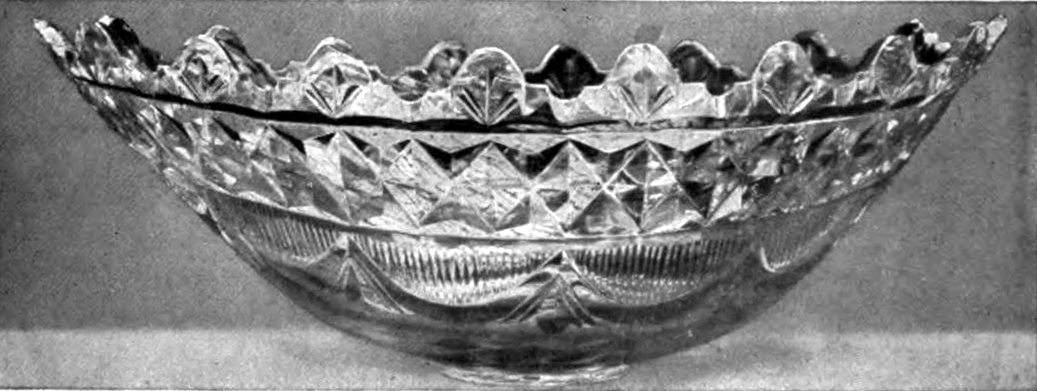
Cut glass bowl from Waterford Glassworks, 18th century

=== Waterford Glassworks ===
The origins of crystal production in Waterford date back to 1783, when George Penrose and his nephew William Penrose started their business, the Waterford Glassworks. It produced extremely fine flint glass that became world-renowned. That firm closed in June 1851, with the loss of 53 to 100 jobs.

=== Revival attempts ===
The Department of Agriculture and Technical Instruction for Ireland, led by Sir Horace Plunkett, had sponsored John St John Lyburn's experiments at replicating the Waterford Glassworks style of glass at a small glassworks built at the Greater Cork International Exhibition of 1903. Lyburn was later sent to discuss a 1912 proposal by the principal of Waterford's Central Technical Institute to provide instruction in glassmaking, which was followed by a 1913 proposal for commercial production within the school and there was discussion with an American investor seeking a glass factory location in Ireland. The Bishop of Waterford and Lismore, Richard Sheehan, was opposed to foreign investment due to the risk of "foreign influences", and the investor was not persuaded to set up in Waterford.

In 1933, a Belgian company explored opening a finishing plant in Waterford, and this was discussed with the Minister for Industry and Commerce, Seán Lemass, who was keen to secure a glass factory for Waterford. The Belgian project did not proceed but in 1935 a Dublin jeweller, Bernard J. Fitzpatrick, approached a senior official in the Department of Industry and Commerce about an Irish glass-making concept, and in 1937 a local group proposed a project to involve the German company of Otto Maetz of Düsseldorf. This latter was studied by Lemass, still Minister for Industry and Commerce, and the Irish representative in Berlin, Charles Bewley, but was not realised. Meantime, in 1938 Fitzpatrick approached a Czech friend and supplier, Charles Bacik, (Note: Charles Bacik is a grandfather of Ivana Bacik, elected leader of the Labour Party in 2022.) who had four glass factories, about setting up in Waterford. Bacik expressed interest but could not move to Ireland due to his commitments to a young family, and further discussions were delayed by World War II.

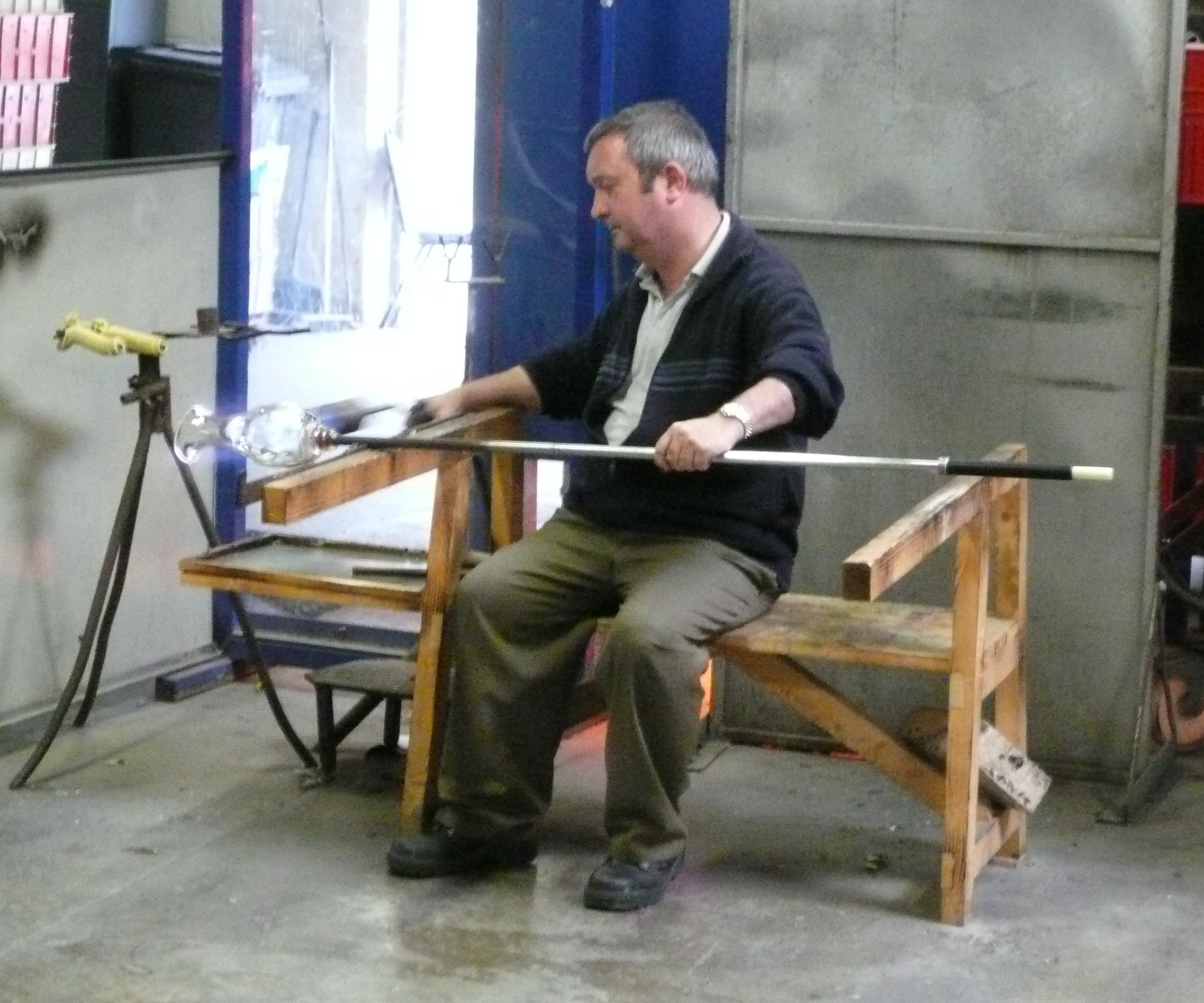
Glass blower at Waterford glass factory

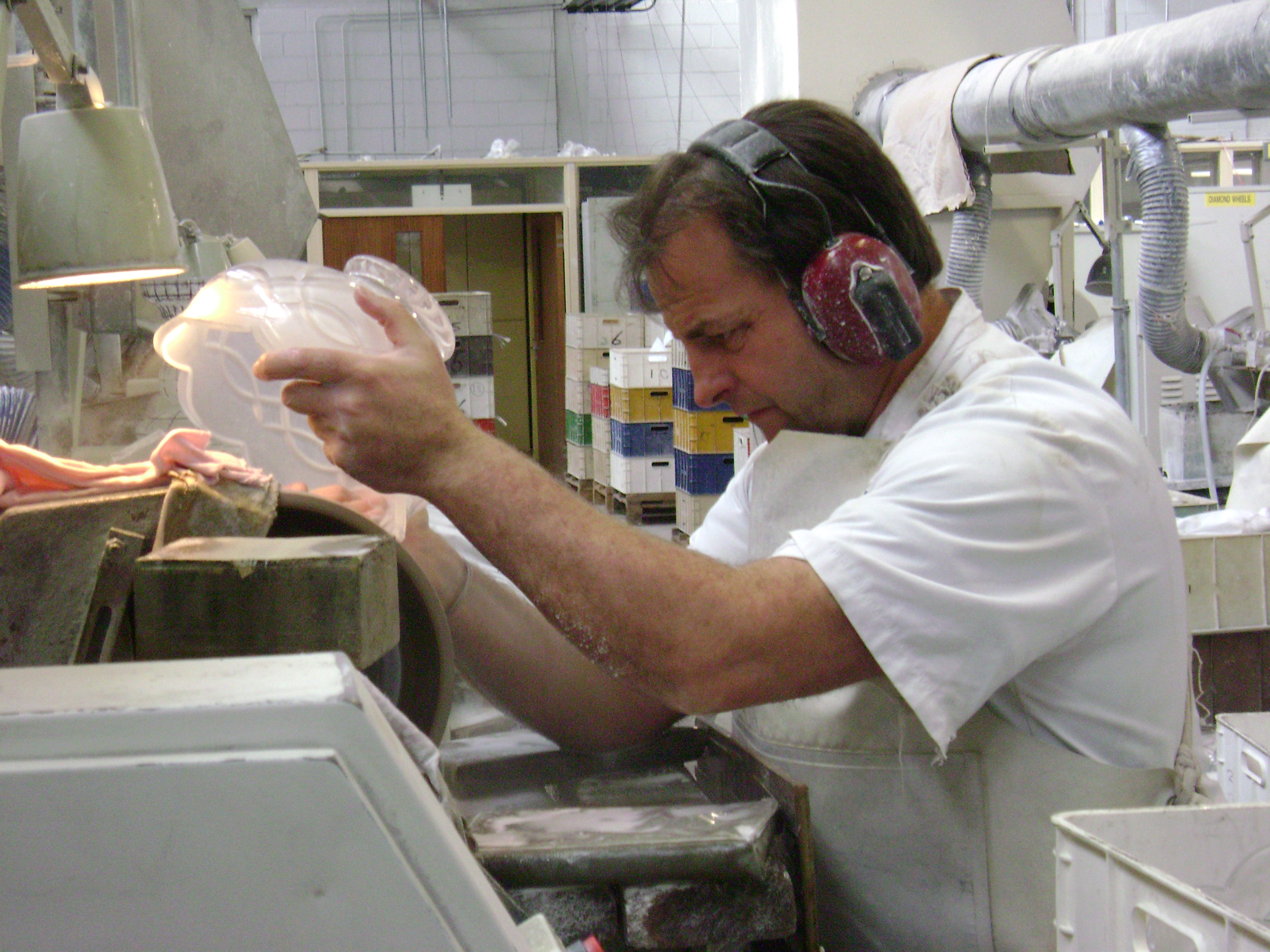
A workman at Waterford Crystal cutting glass

=== Foundation of 1947 ===
After also exploring Carlow as a possible location, Bacik formally applied for a lease on the Ballytruckle lands in January 1947, and it was granted for 75 years. Finance was secured from various sources, including a government loan, and construction began on 3 April 1947. Skilled crystal workers were not available in Ireland, so continental Europeans were engaged, starting in June 1947 with Bacik's fellow countryman and former intern, the designer Miroslav Havel. A glass-cutting machine began operation for apprentice work in August 1947, but progress was limited by an explosion, and initial production was only of "soda glass". First glass blowing was on 11 September 1947, and first official cutting on 21 September.

By the early 1950s, it had been taken over as a subsidiary of the Irish Glass Bottle company, owned by Joseph McGrath, Richard Duggan and Spencer Freeman of the Irish Hospitals' Sweepstake, heavy investors in Irish business at that time.

At peak operations, Waterford employed 3,000 staff in a city of 46,000. In 1971, the company provided playing facilities for a newly formed association football club at Waterford Crystal Sports Complex in Ballinaneesagh. The club, initially named Waterford Glass F.C., later changed their name to Waterford Crystal F.C. following re-branding of the company.

In 1986, Waterford Crystal acquired Wedgwood, a British manufacturer of bone china and fine ceramics, to create a new Ireland-based luxury brands group called Waterford Wedgwood plc.

=== 1990s onward ===
Jasper Conran began designing his signature range of crystal for Waterford in 1999. The endeavour evolved into four unique lines for Waterford, and a complementary tableware collection in fine bone china for Wedgwood in 2001. The Hong Kong-born Irish fashion designer John Rocha started designing a range of cut crystal stemware and vases in collaboration with glass designer Marcus Notley in 2001.

=== Consolidation ===
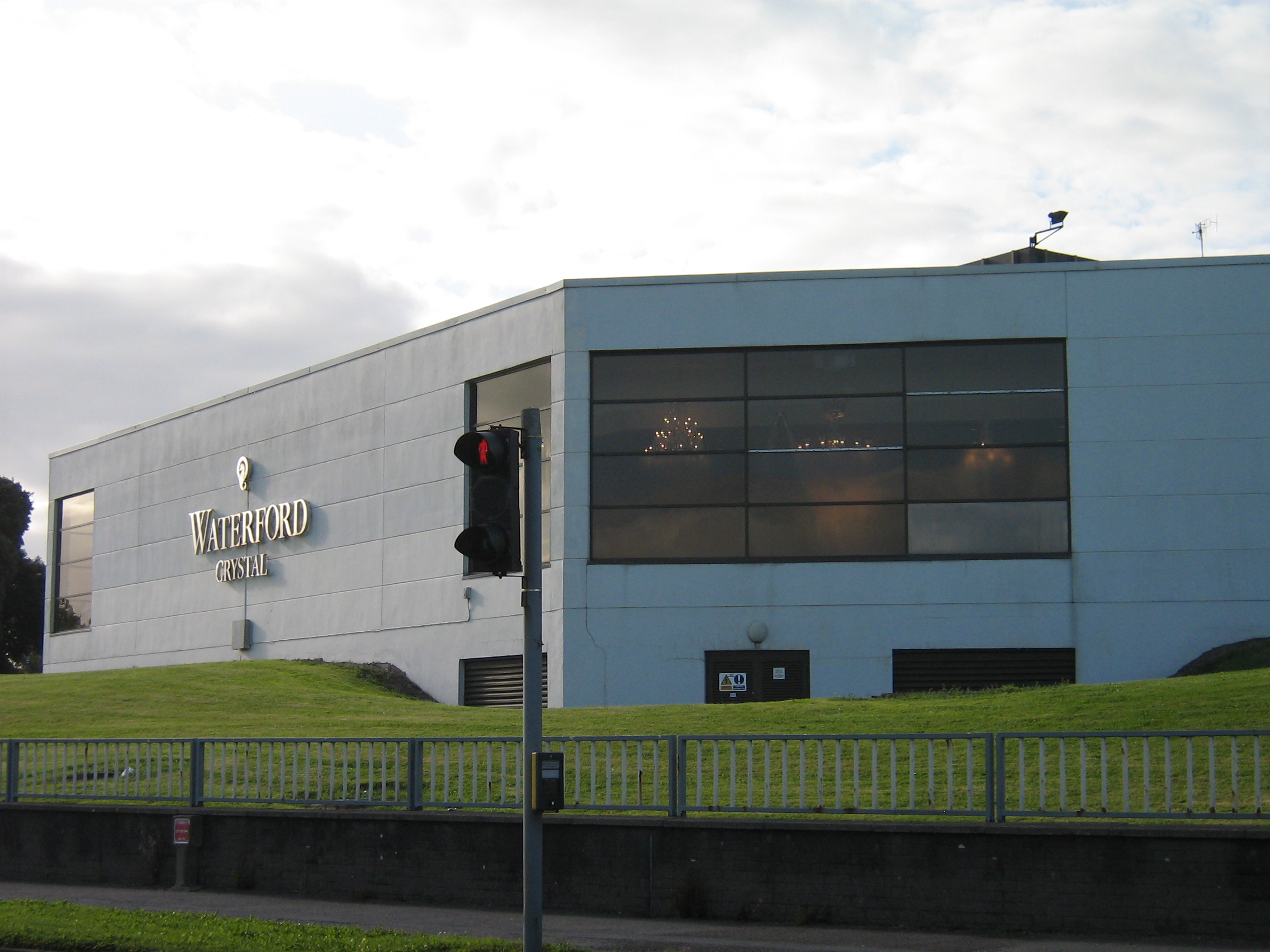
Previous Waterford Crystal showroom at Kilbarry in Waterford

Due to rising competition, Waterford Wedgwood announced the closure of its second Irish factory, in Dungarvan, in May 2005, in order to consolidate all operations into the main factory in Kilbarry, Waterford City, where 1,000 people were employed by the company. The move resulted in nearly 500 Dungarvan workers losing their jobs. In this period, some production (20% by 2007) was outsourced to factories in the Czech Republic and Poland, and later also to Slovenia.

Waterford Crystal Limited was, until March 2009, a subsidiary of Waterford Wedgwood plc, itself formed through the acquisition by the then Waterford Glass Group of the famous pottery manufacturer Josiah Wedgwood in 1986. The last chairman was Tony O'Reilly, and the CEO was John Foley. The leading shareholders of the holding company were former billionaire O'Reilly and his family, joined in the last decade by O'Reilly's brother-in-law, Greek shipping heir Peter Goulandris.

=== 2009 receivership ===
Waterford Wedgwood was forced into receivership in early 2009 during the Great Recession. On 5 January 2009, news of the receivership of Waterford Wedgwood plc was announced in Ireland and the UK.

On 30 January 2009, it was announced that the Waterford Crystal plant in Kilbarry was to shut down immediately, despite earlier promises to discuss any such move with the unions in advance. The Kilbarry operation featured a tourist centre offering guided tours of the factory, a gift shop, café, and gallery. Many of the employees performed an unofficial sit-in. The sit-in made the BBC News, hoping to prevail upon receiver Deloitte to retain those jobs. On 4 February 2009, there were protests across the city at how the workers were being treated. On 27 February 2009, the receiver, David Carson of Deloitte, confirmed that US equity firm KPS Capital Partners was to purchase certain overseas assets and businesses of the Waterford Wedgwood Group. The sit-in ended in March 2009 after workers agreed to split a payment of €10m. The fight by the workers to keep the factory open is chronicled in a PBS online documentary.

Under the receivership managed by Deloitte, ownership of most of Waterford Wedgwood plc's assets was transferred to KPS Capital Partners in March 2009. Waterford Crystal, along with Wedgwood, Royal Doulton, and other brands, were transferred to a new company named WWRD Holdings Limited (WWRD). The sale did not include the factory or visitor centre in Kilbarry, and the visitor centre shut its doors on 22 January 2010. A new visitor and manufacturing facility opened in June 2010. Its US business filed for Chapter 7 bankruptcy liquidation in April 2009.

=== Acquisition by Fiskars ===
On 11 May 2015, in a deal that closed in July 2015, Fiskars Corporation, a Finnish maker of home products, agreed to buy 100% of the holdings of WWRD. On 2 July 2015, the acquisition of WWRD by Fiskars Corporation was completed, including the brands Waterford, Wedgwood, Royal Doulton, Royal Albert and Rogaška. The acquisition was approved by the US antitrust authorities.

== Products ==
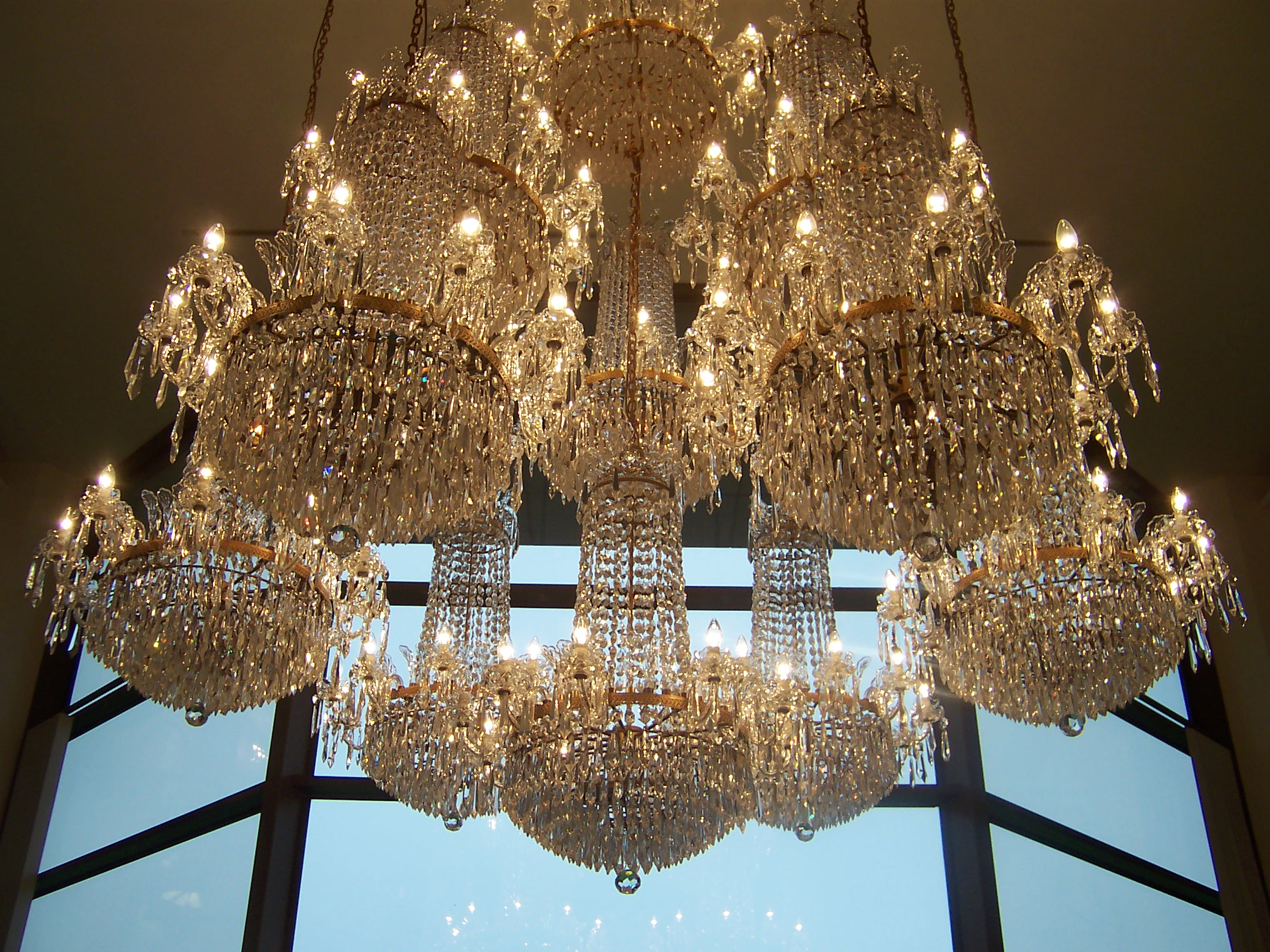
Waterford crystal chandelier

Most Waterford crystal is now produced outside Ireland in countries such as Slovenia, the Czech Republic, Hungary and Germany. Waterford produces a number of patterns of lead and non-lead crystal stemware, including lines such as Adare, Alana, Colleen, Kincora, Lismore, Maeve, Tramore, and others.

In 1966, Waterford's chandeliers were installed in Westminster Abbey for the 900th anniversary of the dedication of the abbey after Christoper Hildyard, a minor canon of the abbey for 45 years, convinced the Guinness family to pay for them. Chandeliers hang in other notable buildings, such as Windsor Castle, and the Kennedy Center, Washington, D.C. Waterford Crystal made the 2,688 crystals for the New Year's Eve Ball that is dropped each year in New York City's Times Square. The ball is an 11,875-pound (5,386 kg) geodesic orb, 12 feet (3.7 m) in diameter and is lit by 32,256 Lumileds Luxeon Rebel LEDs.

One of the most popular products in their collection is the "apprentice bowl". It requires 600 precision cuts, all done by hand. Cutters would set out to complete this bowl in their fifth and final year of apprenticeship. They were only permitted three attempts, where the cutter would then be graded and if they passed it would receive the Waterford Crystal watermark.

Sporting trophies are also crafted by Waterford, such as the Masters Series crystal shield trophies that are awarded to the winner of each of the nine men's professional tennis Masters Series tournaments, the AFCA National Championship Trophy that is awarded to the US college football team which finishes the season at the top of the Coaches Poll, and a representation of the Ashes urn that is presented to the winners of the Test cricket series between England and Australia. The trophy for the Masters snooker championship is also made by Waterford Crystal, as is the Scottish Open snooker championship trophy. Also crafted by Waterford are the winning trophies for the French, Belgian and German Grand Prix in Formula One, a bat and ball trophy presented at the final game at Yankee Stadium to Derek Jeter and a glass tennis racket for Boris Becker. They also design the trophies for the People's Choice Awards.

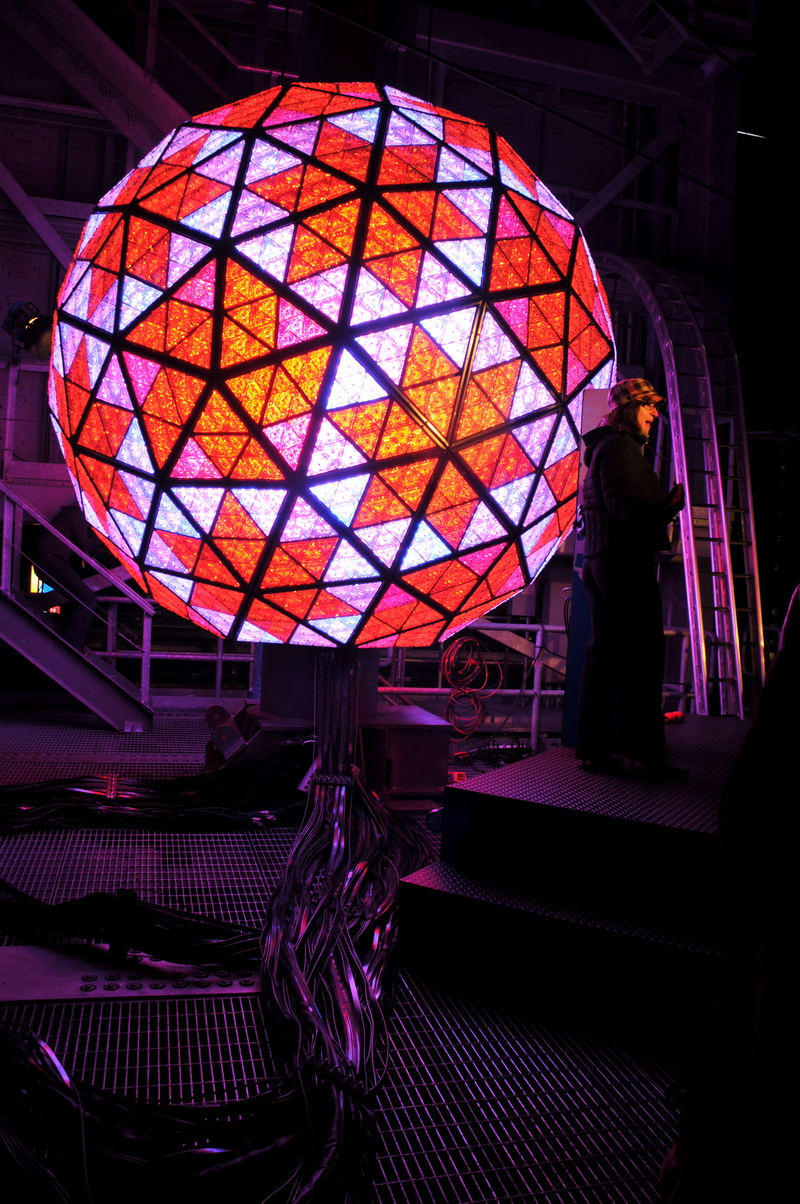
Waterford Crystal Ball, designed for the New Year's celebrations at Times Square

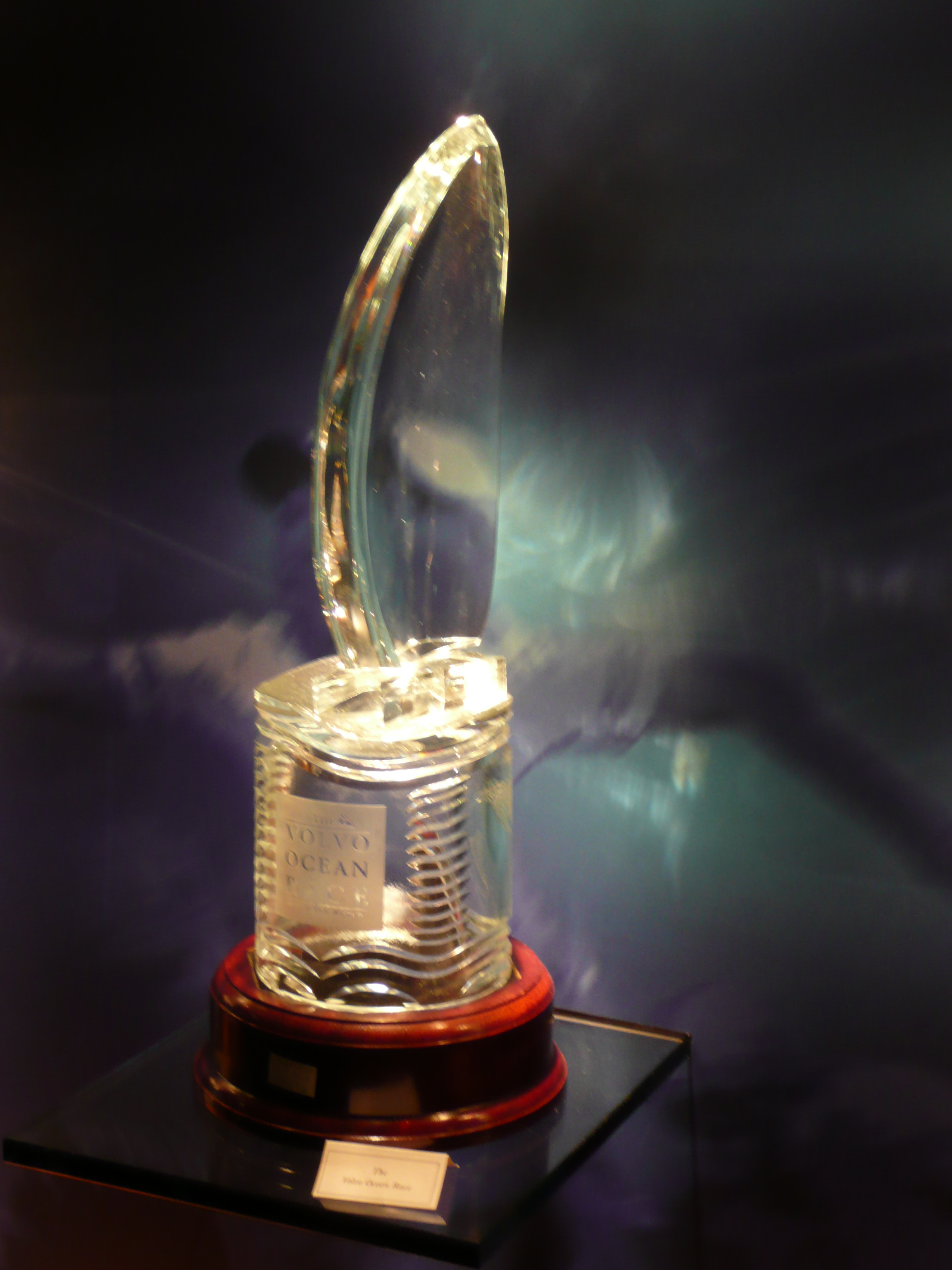
Waterford Crystal Volvo Ocean Challenge Trophy
