= WWRD Holdings Limited =

Consumer goods company

- Company type: Subsidiary
- Industry: Household goods
- Predecessor: Waterford Wedgwood plc
- Founded: 2009
- Founder: KPS Capital Partners
- Products: Ceramics and glass items
- Parent: Fiskars
- Divisions: Waterford Crystal; Wedgwood; Royal Doulton; Royal Albert; Rogaška
- Website: www.wwrd.com

WWRD Holdings Limited was a company created by KPS Capital Partners in 2009 out of the remains of Irish firm Waterford Wedgwood plc, and in 2015 became part of Finnish home products maker Fiskars. The company owned Waterford Crystal, Wedgwood and Royal Doulton, among other brands, and the name WWRD was formed from the initials of these brands.

== History ==
On 5 January 2009, following years of financial problems at the group level, and after a share placement failed during the 2008 financial crisis, Waterford Wedgwood was placed into administration on a "going concern" basis, with 1800 employees remaining. On 27 February 2009, Waterford Wedgwood's receiver, Deloitte, announced that the New York-based private equity firm KPS Capital Partners had purchased "certain Irish and UK assets of Waterford Wedgwood and the assets of several of its Irish and UK subsidiaries" in a transaction expected to be completed in March.

In March 2009, KPS Capital Partners announced that it had acquired group assets in a range of countries, including the UK, USA and Indonesia, would invest €100 million, and move a number of jobs to Asia to cut costs and return the firm to profitability. In a move that had begun under the previous owners, some 1500 jobs were cut in the UK, leaving 800 workers in the UK producing only the high-end Wedgwood products. KPS Capital Partners placed Wedgwood into a group of companies known as WWRD.

In May 2015, Fiskars, a Finnish maker of home products, agreed to buy 100% of the holdings of WWRD. On 2 July 2015, the acquisition of WWRD by Fiskars was completed, including the brands Waterford, Wedgwood, Royal Doulton, Royal Albert and Rogaška. The acquisition was approved by the US antitrust authorities.
