= Princess Yachts =

Luxury motor yacht manufacturer

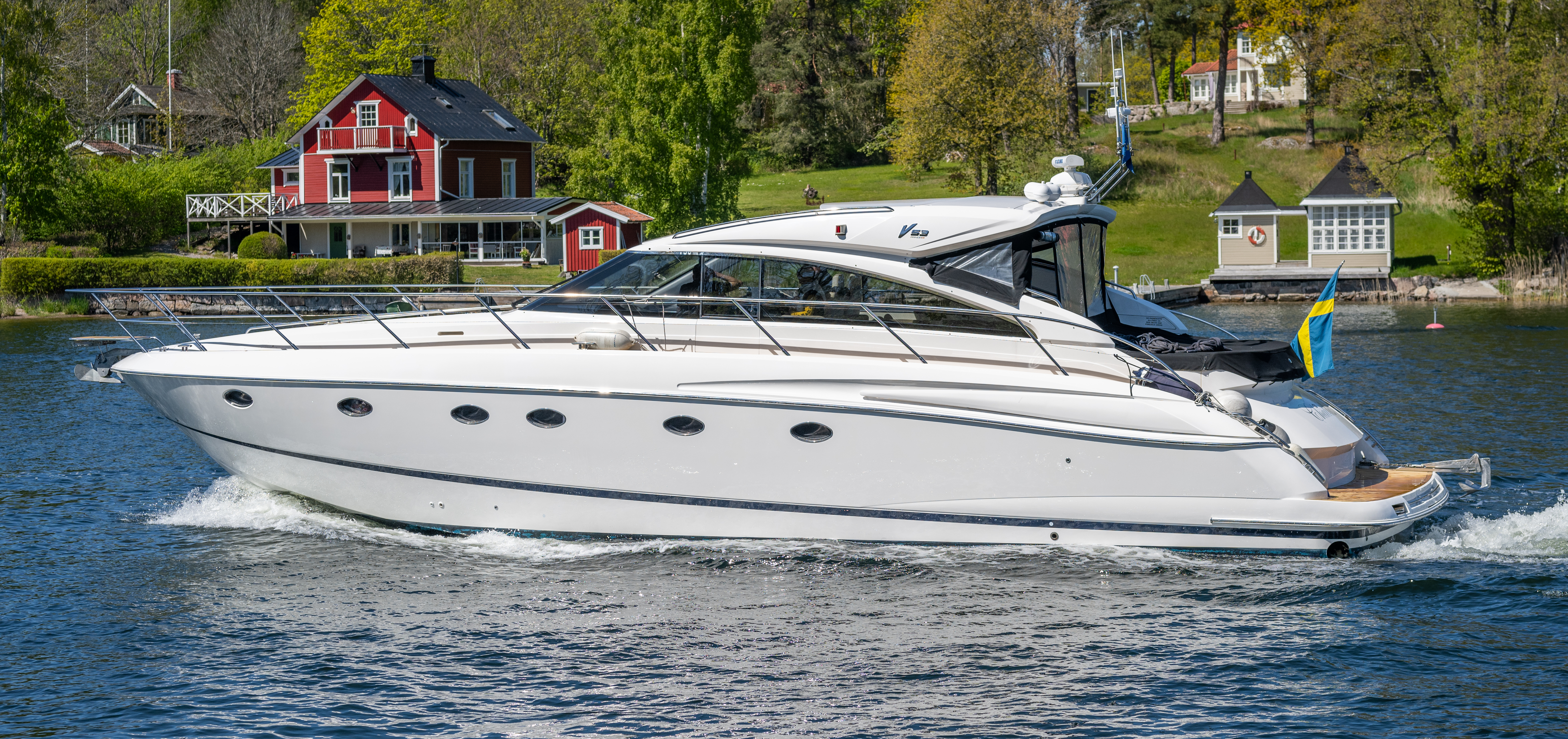
- A Princess V53
- Type: Limited company
- Industry: Boat building
- Founded: 1965; 61 years ago
- Headquarters: Plymouth, United Kingdom
- Key people: Brian Phillips, Cliff Viney and David King (Co-Founders), Will Green (Executive Chairman)
- Number of employees: Approximately 3,200
- Parent: KPS Capital Partners
- Website: Princess Yachts

Princess Yachts Limited is a British motor yacht manufacturer based in Plymouth, Devon, England.

== Profile ==
Established in Plymouth in 1965 as Marine Projects (Plymouth) Ltd, Princess Yachts was bought in 1981 by South African businessman Graham J. Beck. Marine Projects became Princess Yachts International PLC in 2001. In June 2008, Beck sold a 75% stake in the business to French businessman Bernard Arnault's investment group, L Capital 2 FCPR, an investment group co-sponsored by LVMH (Moët Hennessy Louis Vuitton) and Groupe Arnault. In January 2016, L Capital merged with Catterton to become L Catterton. In February 2023 Princess Yachts was sold to KPS Capital Partners an American Investment company.

Princess Yachts operates in 119 countries and employs over 2,800 people worldwide (down a lot due to recent redundacies), whilst their shipyards cover a combined area of over 1.1 million square feet.

== Range of yachts ==
The range is sub-divided into the following class types: X Class, Y Class, F Class, V Class, S Class and R class.

- X Class: Super Flybridge yachts ranging from 80 to 95 feet.
- Y Class: Motor yachts ranging from 72 to 95 feet.
- F Class: Flybridge yachts ranging from 45 to 65 feet.
- V Class: sports yachts ranging from 40 to 65 feet
- S Class: Sportbridge yachts ranging from 62 to 80 feet.

== Shipyards ==
Princess Yachts has 5 sites across Plymouth covering over 1.1 million square feet.

- New Port Street: Originally just one rented shed, Princess now operates the entirety of New Port Street and has had its head office on site since 1965.
- Lee Mill: Collaboratively developed by Naval architect Bernard Olesinski and Marine Projects in the late 1970s. For some time Lee Mill was operated by Felix Engineering, a subsidiary of Princess Yachts, until 2018.
- Langage: The Langage site was built specifically for Princess in 1989, The site has undergone significant expansion since.
- Coypool: Purchased in 1996.
- South Yard: Previously part of HMNB Devonport but released by the Royal Navy in 2012, The South Yard site has been used by Princess to build boats up to 40 metres in length. Within the site are many features of historical interest including:
  - The East Ropery built 1763-71 and the only Devonport ropery to survive the Plymouth Blitz, It is now used by Princess to mock up new yachts.
  - The Hangman's Cell was used to hang over 100 French sailors during the Napoleonic wars and contains the only working set of gallows in the UK.
  - No1 Dock started construction in 1692. it was the first dock to be built near Plymouth and the first stepped, stone walled dry-dock in Europe. The success of this was instrumental in the decision for an entire dockyard to be built in what is now known as Devonport.
  - No2 Dock was built in 1720 and is significantly larger than No1. It is now used for testing by Princess.
  - No3 Slip which was used to launch HMS Scylla, the last warship to be built in Devonport in 1968 and is now used by Princess to launch yachts.
  - Kings Hill Gazebo which was built for a visiting King George III in 1822.

== Partnership with BAR Technologies and Pininfarina ==
In January 2018, Princess Yachts announced they were partnering with BAR Technologies to create a new yacht, the Princess R Class, to be launched later in 2018(3). BAR Technologies, founded by Ben Ainslie, is a team of naval architects and engineers formed to use the skills and experience built up by the British yacht racing team, Land Rover BAR.

The yacht was fully carbon fibre and featured Princess’ Active Foil System, resulting in Princess’ fastest yacht to date. Princess also collaborated with Italian design house, Pininfarina to create the R Class' carbon-fibre monocoque hull, enhancing the boat's aerodynamics.

During its development stage, the R Class was covered in dazzle camouflage to confuse the eye and help conceal its design from competitors. The camouflage was created by Katie Sheppard, a student at the Plymouth College of Art, who won a competition to design the pattern.
