= Chassis Brakes International =

Automotive parts manufacturer

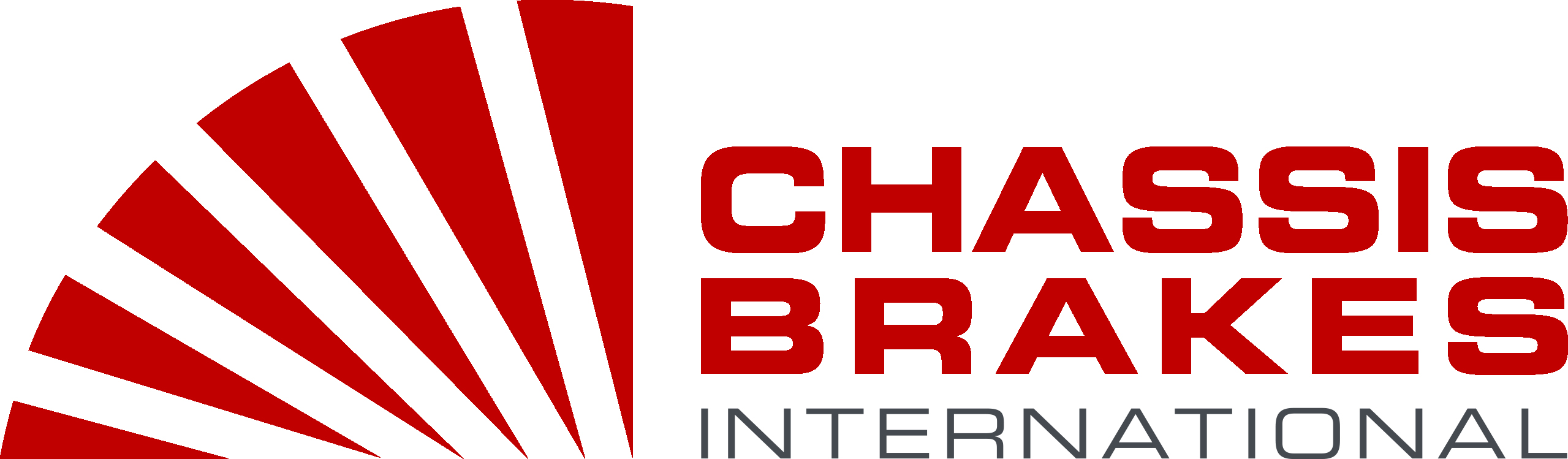
- Industry: Automotive Industry
- Founded: 2012
- Defunct: 2019
- Fate: Sold to Hitachi
- Headquarters: Eindhoven
- Number of locations: 15 countries
- Production output: Disc Brakes, Drum Brakes, Automated Parking Brakes, Rotors
- Number of employees: 5500
- Website: chassisbrakes.com

Chassis Brakes International was a multinational manufacturer of automotive brakes and brake components. It was formed in June 2012 when the brakes division of Robert Bosch GmbH was sold to KPS Capital Partners and was based in Netherlands. It was one of the three largest brake system manufacturers in the world.

The company had factories in 15 countries and had a workforce of about 5200, of which some forty percent were in Europe and the remainder in Asian and South American countries. Chassis Brakes International's French entity was a member of the Fédération des Industries des Equipements pour Véhicules, the French federation of vehicle part manufacturers.

In 2019, the group was sold to the automotive system division of Japanese group, Hitachi.
