= Oldcastle BuildingEnvelope =

North American building materials company

- Formerly: Oldcastle Glass
- Predecessor: Vistawall Group, Hordis Brothers, North American Glass and others
- Founded: 1990; 35 years ago
- Founder: CRH plc
- Headquarters: Dallas, Texas, United States
- Products: Architectural glass, windows, skylights, glass walls, security glazing
- Owner: KPS Capital Partners
- Website: obe.com

Oldcastle BuildingEnvelope (OBE) is a North American manufacturer, fabricator and distributor of building materials including architectural hardware, glass and glazing systems.

== History ==
Oldcastle glass was created through the merging of multiple glass manufacturers, including Hordis Brothers (marketed as "Arm-R-Clad"), HGP Industries, United Tempering Systems, North American Glass, O&W Glass, Downey Glass, Glass Distributors of America, General Glass, Tempglass, Armourguard Glass Products, Wescan Glass Industries, Free State Glass Industries, and Oldcastle Specialty Glass.

In June 2007 BlueScope Steel Limited sold its Vistawall Group division for $190 million to Oldcastle Glass Inc, a subsidiary of CRH plc.

In June 2010 Oldcastle Glass rebranded to Oldcastle BuildingEnvelope.

On February 28, 2022, it was announced that CRH would be selling Oldcastle BuildingEnvelope for $3.8 billion to KPS Capital Partners.
