= David Sculley =

American businessman

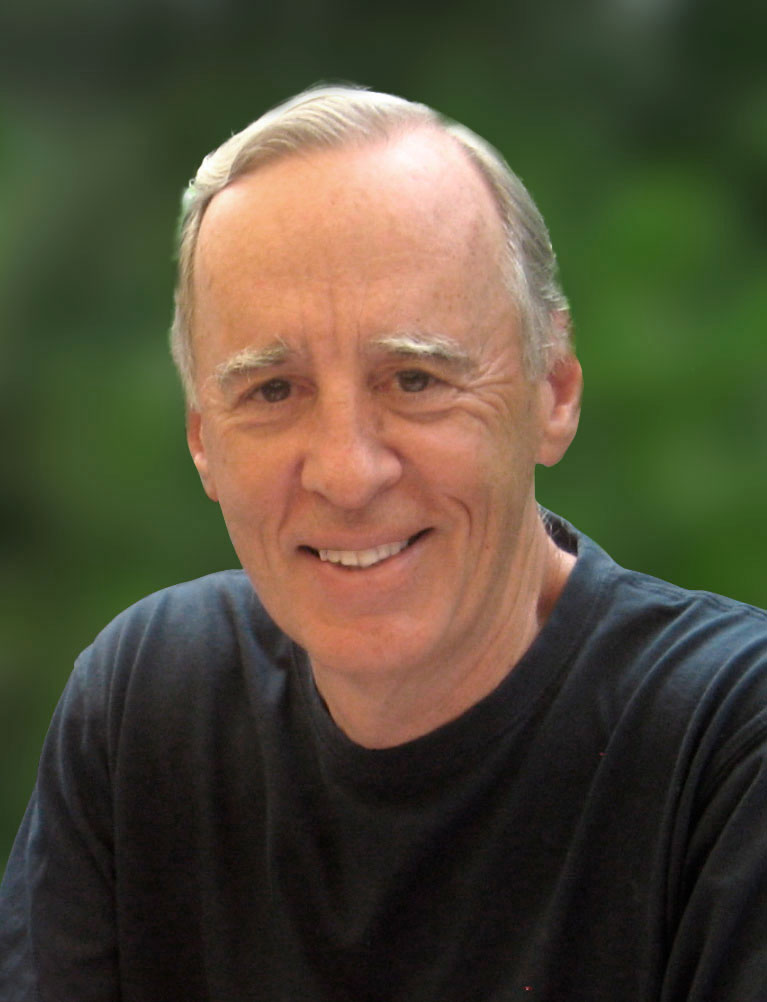
- Occupations: President & CEO of H.J. Heinz USA (1985-90), Sculley Brothers Investments

David Sculley is an American businessman and former President & CEO of H.J. Heinz U.S.A. (1985–90). In 1996, David joined his brothers to form the private investment firm, Sculley Brothers, with its head office in New York City. He is the youngest brother of John Sculley, former President & CEO of Pepsi and Apple and Arthur Sculley, former head of J.P. Morgan's Private Bank.

== Early life ==
David grew up in St. James, Long Island with summers in Bermuda where his mother was born and where most of his relatives live. He graduated from St. Mark's School in Southborough, Mass. in 1964 and received a cum laude degree in economics from Harvard in 1968. While at Harvard, David was Producer of the Hasty Pudding Theatrical Show.

== Career ==
=== Lever Brothers ===
Following Harvard, he joined Lever Brothers in New York City in marketing. David rose rapidly through the marketing ranks and became a Group Product Manager of the company's largest brand group, “all” detergents within two years. By using a comparative advertising campaign, which showed a drop of grease quickly disappearing in the “all” solution while not dispersing in the competitive products, “all” was able to double its market share in 2 years.

=== H.J. Heinz ===
In 1974, David was recruited by H.J. Heinz in Pittsburgh as General Manager of Consumer Marketing. In 1982, he moved with his family to England for three years to be Deputy Managing Director of Heinz U.K. He returned to Pittsburgh to be President & CEO of H.J. Heinz U.S.A. from 1985 to 1990.

From 1990 to 1996, he ran most of Heinz's international operations, including Weight Watchers. During his 22-year career with Heinz, David is credited with leading the team to acquire Weight Watchers and the development of the plastic squeeze bottle for Heinz Ketchup.

=== Sculley Brothers ===
In 1996, David joined his brothers to form the private investment firm, Sculley Brothers, with its head office in New York City. The firm focused on actively investing in early stage companies. The portfolio consisted of a range of consumer, technology and financial services companies. One company which David founded, Country Gourmet Foods, which marketed Wolfgang Puck Organic Soups, was sold to Campbells in 2008.

=== Waterford Wedgwood ===
In 2009, David took over as CEO of Waterford Wedgwood, based in London, after the company ran into financial difficulty. He acquired its competitor, Royal Doulton, and then led the sale of the entity to KPS Fund, a private equity firm based in New York City.

=== Current ===
David was chairman and an investor in MDLIVE, a rapidly growing telehealth company which was sold to Cigna in 2021. He is also a major investor in nirvanaHealth, a privately held healthcare company and an advisor to the company.

== Personal life ==
David was a member of the U.S. Men's Field Hockey team in the early 1970s. He was also Chairman of Allegheny General Hospital in Pittsburgh, PA. He was married to his wife, Paula Cook Sculley (deceased), for 40 years. He married Christa Margaret Sculley in 2019. David has two children, Heather and David as well as three grandchildren.
