= Winoa =

French steel abrasives production and distribution company

- Company type: S.A. (corporation)
- Industry: Production and distribution of steel abrasives for the treatment and transformation of metal surfaces. Stone cutting
- Founded: 1961; 65 years ago
- Headquarters: Le Cheylas (38), France
- Key people: Ramesh Krishnan (CEO)
- Revenue: 320 million EUR (2018)
- Number of employees: 800 (group) (2018)
- Website: winoagroup.com

Winoa is a French steel abrasives production and distribution company, specializing in the preparation, treatment, and transformation of metal surfaces. Winoa manufactures steel shot and grit, stainless steel abrasives and cut-wire, technological tools and services, as well as the production of steel grit used for cutting stone. The company is headquartered in Le Cheylas, France.

== History ==
The company was founded in 1961 through a joint venture between a subsidiary of the French group Wendel and the US Wheelabrator corporation. The company took the name WINOA on its 50th anniversary in 2011.

In the 1980s, the group underwent development following acquisitions in the UK, Italy, Canada and the United States. This development continued into the 1990s in the Czech Republic, Spain, Austria, Slovenia, South Africa, Brazil and Asia (China, Korea, Thailand and Japan).

In 2005, Winoa was acquired by LBO France.

In 2014, the investment firm KKR acquired the company after it had suffered from the 2009 economic crisis, as business in its primary markets (the automotive, steel and construction industries) had slowed significantly. The group, subsequently restructured, set its focus on three regions: Russia, India, and Southeast Asia.

On March 21, 2017, after three years of debt restructuring, KPS Capital Partners LP became its majority shareholder. The company announced its intention to develop in China and India.

On February 23, 2021, Blackstone entered into an agreement to further invest in Winoa Group. Blackstone Credit has been part of the Winoa investors consortium since 2017.

== Sites ==
Winoa is headquartered in Le Cheylas (Isère), where it was founded. In addition to its French plant and its research and test centers, it has 9 manufacturing facilities located in Spain, Canada, South Korea, Japan, Slovenia, Brazil, Thailand, and Russia. As of 2018, 180 employees worked at Le Cheylas.
