= Jaana Tuominen =

Finnish business executive (born 1960)

Jaana Maija-Liisa Tuominen (born 15 October 1960) is a Finnish business executive. Since 2008, she has been managing director and chief executive officer of the Finnish coffee and cocoa company Gustav Paulig. She has accepted the position of CEO of Fiskars, where she served from 2018 to 2020.

Tuominen attended the Åbo Akademi in Turku where she studied chemical engineering, graduating in 1985. After becoming customer support engineer with Finnsugar Biochemicals, USA, in 1986, she returned to Sweden in 1989 to take up a position as area sales manager with Valmet pulp and paper company. From 1993 to 1998, she held various positions in marketing management before becoming managing director at NAF Flowserve (formerly Instrumentarium). In 1998, she was appointed general manager of GE Healthcare.

In addition to her appointment as CEO of Paulig in 2008, she became a non-executive director at the Rautaruukki iron and metal products firm in 2010.

In an interview in 2012 with the Nordic magazine Alumni, Tuominen commented on the effects of increasing the participation of women in senior management in Finland by introducing quotas (which still do not exist): "Things will have to change, because the dearth of female executives is already damaging business, and as demographic shifts make good people increasingly hard to find, the damage will get worse. Women - and men - need to feel they can work in an environment where they can be themselves and do the best job they possibly can."
