= KPS Capital Partners =

American private equity firm

- Type: Private
- Industry: Private equity
- Founded: 1991
- Headquarters: New York, New York
- Key people: Michael Psaros, David Shapiro, Raquel Palmer, Jay Bernstein
- Products: Leveraged buyout
- Total assets: $19 billion
- Website: www.kpsfund.com

KPS Capital Partners is an American investment company that manages KPS Special Situation Funds, a family of investment funds. KPS specifically invests out of two funds raised in October 2019: KPS Special Situations Fund V ($6.12 billion) and KPS Mid-Cap Fund ($1.02 billion).

In July 2025, PitchBook ranked KPS Capital Partners as the top-performing fund series in the Buyout Megafunds category of its 2024 Global Manager Performance Score League Tables, which evaluated 68 global fund families with most recent fund sizes of at least $5 billion.

== History ==
The company was founded in 1991 by Eugene Keilin, Michael Psaros, and David Shapiro, hence the KPS name. KPS raised its first institutional fund in 1998. On May 6, 2019, KPS Capital Partners signed an agreement with Brunswick Corporation to purchase its fitness business valued at $490 million in an all cash transaction. In 2020, KPS completed five platform investments, including IKG (January 2020), Lufkin Industries (June 2020), Briggs & Stratton (September 2020), AM General (October 2020) and Hussey Copper (December 2020). In 2021, KPS announced the acquisition of the aluminum rolling business from Norsk Hydro and the EMEA food and consumer packaging business from Crown Holdings.

== Operations ==
The firm is not a hedge fund, but focuses on making controlling equity investments in manufacturing and industrial companies. Many of its investments "involve creating new companies" that buy underperforming assets, such as "companies operating in bankruptcy or in default of obligations to creditors", or otherwise with a history of "recurring operating losses". KPS is a global firm headquartered in New York City with offices in Frankfurt and Amsterdam that invests in both North American and European-headquartered companies. The KPS Funds' portfolio companies currently have assets under management worth $12 billion, operate 158 manufacturing facilities in 22 countries, and have approximately 32,000 employees. In 2019, KPS Fund V, the firm's active flagship fund, had $15 billion of investor demand for a $6 billion fund."

The Financial Times noted that, while private equity firms often have a bad reputation for stripping assets and slashing jobs when buying distressed companies, KPS has established a reputation for constructive relationships with the workforce and their unions. In 2009, Psaros estimated that he had saved about 20,000 jobs. Unions also have appreciated that KPS uses little or no debt in its deals and have called in KPS to save companies. KPS has worked with large manufacturing and industrial unions, having a "history of consulting workers" as noted by AFL-CIO. In Europe, KPS has established relationship and Framework Agreements with the German unions IG Metall and IG BCE.

== Business units ==
The following (incomplete) list includes major companies that are or had been controlled by KPS:

- Princess Yachts
- TaylorMade Golf
- Chase Brass and Copper Company
- Franciscan Ceramics
- Heritage Home Group
- North American Breweries
- Waterford Wedgwood
- Chassis Brakes International
- C&D Technologies
  - Trojan Battery Company
- American & Efird
- Winoa
- IES Holdings
- Life Fitness
- AM General
- Briggs & Stratton
- Hussey Copper
- Speira
- Primient
- Oldcastle BuildingEnvelope
- Innomotics
