= Autoette =

Defunct American motor vehicle manufacturer

Autoette was an American electric microcar manufactured from the late 1930s to the 1970s. The two-seat, three-wheeled microcar was steered by tiller and powered by batteries from Trojan Battery Co., with motive power provided by a converted 24-volt Dodge 1½ hp. electric starter motor and later a proprietary motor built for Autoette. Models included the "CruiseAbout", "Golfmobile" and "Electric Truck".

Autoettes were popular as electric shopping vehicles - small vehicles for trips around town or to shopping centers. They were generally allowed on sidewalks until the 1970s, and various stores had designated parking for them. The Autoette was marketed as a golf cart and an early electric wheelchair or transport for disabled people. Starting in 1953, some models could be equipped with a small "accessible" door on the vehicle's curb side, at the level of the seat, to facilitate entry.

Autoettes were available with various accessories, usually installed by the dealer as upgrades. These included windscreens, doors, convertible tops, side curtains, and more.

The vehicle was designed in Long Beach, California around 1936 by Robert Tafel as an improvement and alternative to “Custer” cars that were popular in the region. He built them on a small scale until entering into a business partnership with Newton Blood in 1940. In 1941 Blood bought into the company, fully acquiring it in 1949. During this time it gained use in warehouses and factories to assist with production during WWII. Following the war, a welder named Royce Seevers worked his way up in the company, becoming the majority owner around 1952. It was briefly sold to Wayne Industries, a street sweeping company, in 1953, but was reacquired by Seevers in 1958 until production stopped in the 1970s.
