= Fiskars =

Finnish consumer goods company

Fiskars Corporation
- Native name: Fiskars Oyj Abp
- Type: Public
- Traded as: Nasdaq Helsinki: FSKRS
- Industry: Consumer goods
- Founded: 1649; 377 years ago
- Headquarters: Espoo, Finland
- Key people: Paul Ehrnrooth (chairman); Nathalie Ahlström (CEO)
- Products: Scissors, gardening tools, kitchenware, glassware, ceramics, knives, outdoor equipment
- Revenue: ▲€1.25 billion (2022)
- Operating income: ▼€151 million (2022)
- Net income: ▲€98.2 million (2022)
- Total assets: ▲€1.59 billion (2022)
- Total equity: ▲€835.6 million (2022)
- Number of employees: 6,595 (as of 31 December 2022)
- Subsidiaries: List: Arabia; Fiskars; Georg Jensen; Gerber Legendary Blades; Hackman; Iittala Group; Kitchen Devils; Rogaška; Rörstrand; Royal Albert; Royal Copenhagen; Royal Doulton; Waterford Crystal; Wedgwood
- Website: fiskarsgroup.com

Fiskars Corporation (natively Fiskars Oyj Abp; Fiskars Oy Ab until 1998) is a Finnish consumer goods company founded in 1649 in Fiskars, a locality in the town of Raseborg, Finland, about 100 kilometres (62 mi) west of Helsinki. It is one of the oldest continuously operating companies in the world. Fiskars' global headquarters are located in the Keilaniemi district of Espoo, near Helsinki.

Fiskars is best known for its orange-handled scissors, which were originally created in 1967. Fiskars operates as an integrated consumer goods company and has two strategic business units – SBU Living and SBU Functional.

== History ==
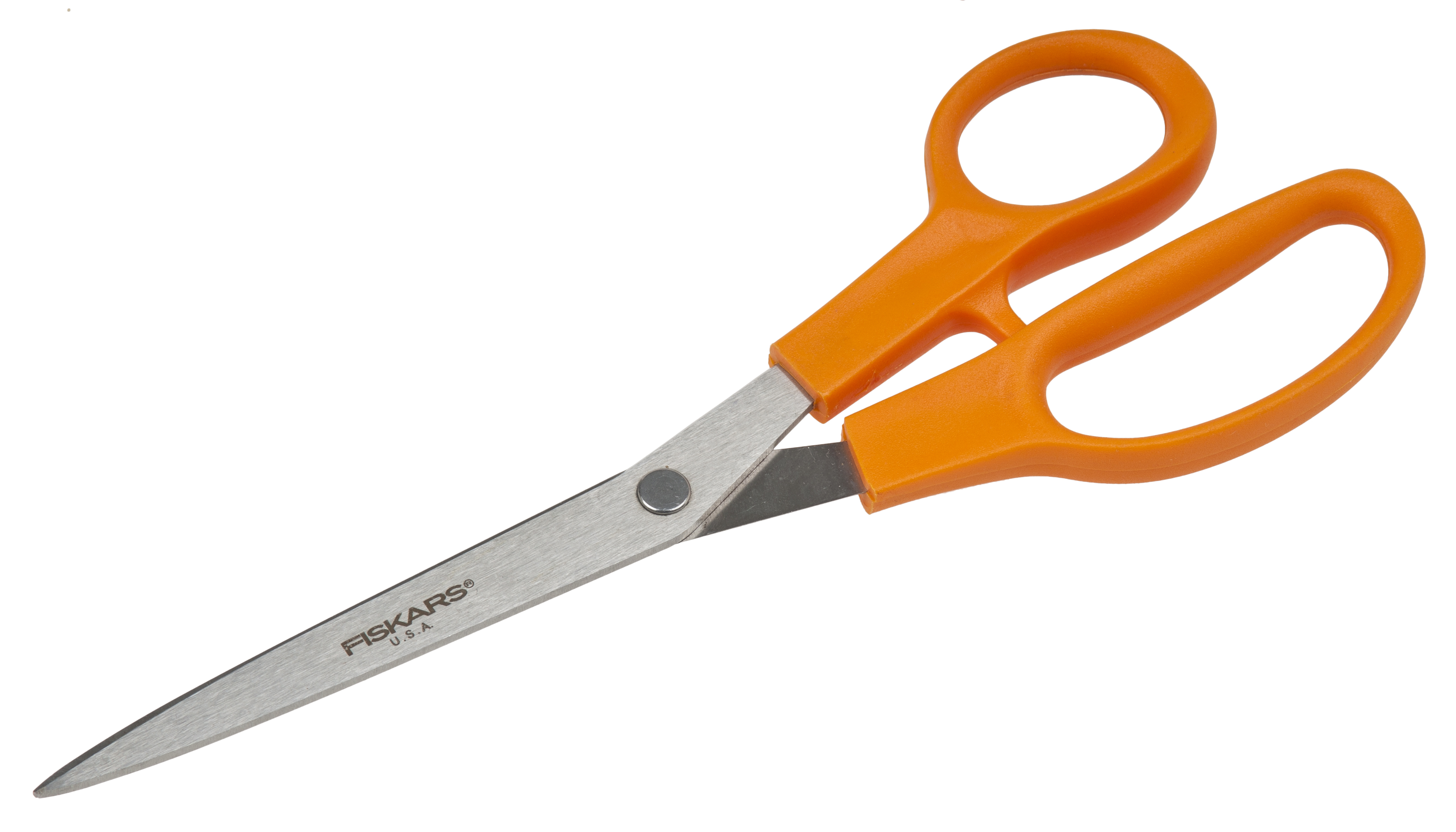
A pair of scissors with orange plastic handles, the best-known Fiskars product

The company traces its origins to 1649, when a Dutch merchant named Peter Thorwöste was given a charter by Christina, Queen of Sweden, to establish a blast furnace and forging operation in the small village of Fiskars; however, he was not permitted to produce cannons. This makes it the oldest privately owned company in Finland. The furnace produced pig iron that was shingled to wrought iron in the finery forges powered by water wheels. In the early years, Fiskars made nails, wire, hoes, and metal-reinforced wheels from wrought iron.

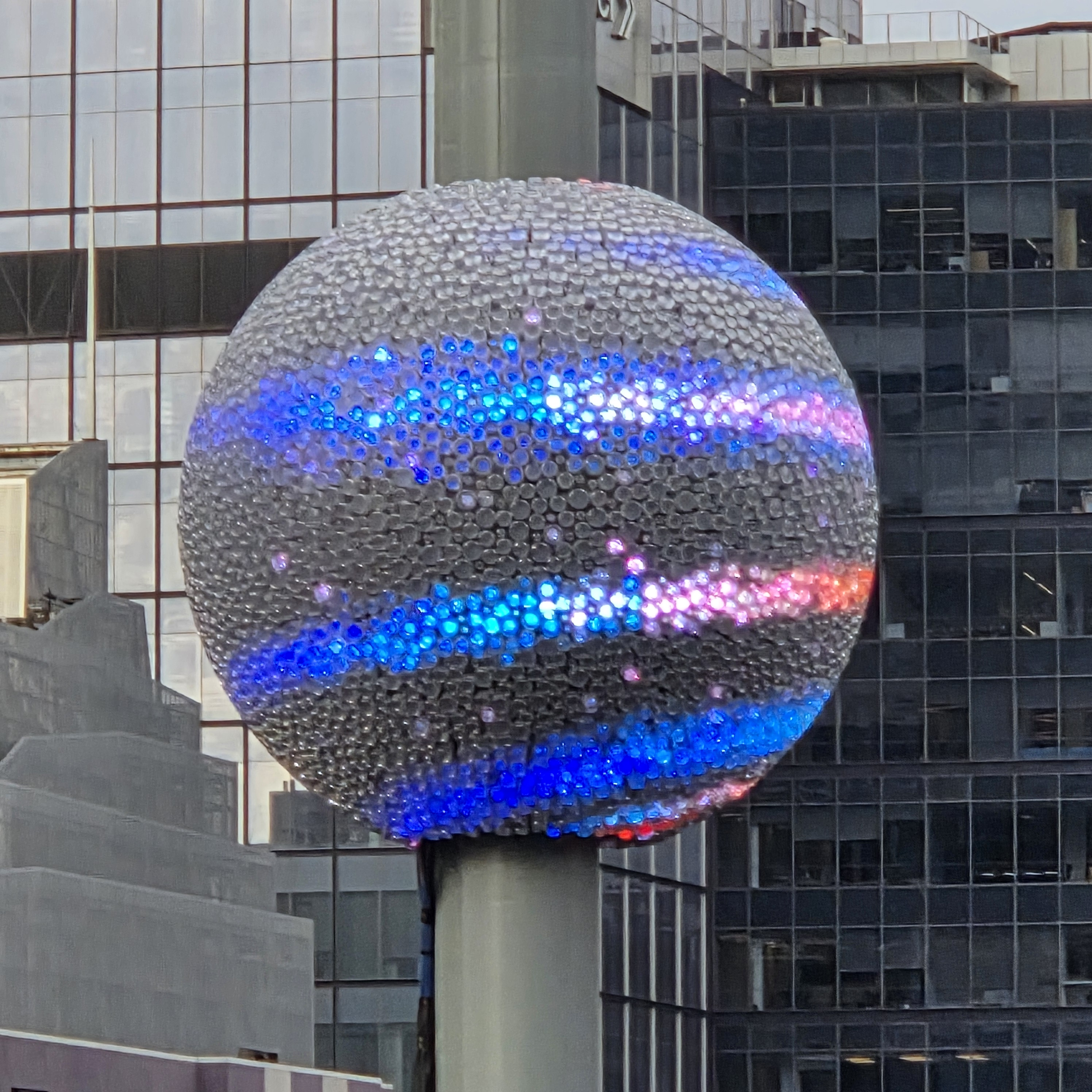
Waterford Crystal Ball, designed for the New Year's celebrations at Times Square, in 2025

In the late eighteenth century, copper was discovered in nearby Orijärvi, and thus the focus of production shifted to processing copper from the Orijärvi mine. For almost 80 years, Fiskars main source of business came from copper; however, by the nineteenth century, there was little copper left in Orijärvi. The original blast furnace was closed in 1802, marking the end of iron manufacturing at the village.

In 1822, the apothecary Johan Jacob Julin (later, von Julin) from Turku acquired the Fiskars ironworks and village. During this time, the ironworks were actively developed and production focused on processing iron. In 1832, the first cutlery mill in Finland was founded in Fiskars, with the company's production range increasing from knives to include forks and scissors.

In 1915, after Julin's death, Fiskars was listed on the Helsinki Stock Exchange. In September 2015, Fiskars celebrated 100 years of being listed on the Nasdaq Helsinki Stock Exchange, along with Nokia, Wärtsilä and UPM.

Fiskars is perhaps best known for its scissors, with their distinct orange-colored handles. The first pair was manufactured in 1967 and had prototypes with handles in black, red, green and orange. After an internal vote at Fiskars, the orange color was chosen. That same orange color, Fiskars Orange, was officially registered as a trademark in Finland in 2003 and in the US in 2007. In 1977, Fiskars founded a scissors factory in the United States to provide a basis for international trade and further expansion.

In 2007, Fiskars acquired both Iittala and Leborgne, which strengthened the company's position in the kitchenware and table-top categories, as well as the garden tools business. The acquisition of Royal Copenhagen in 2013 complemented Fiskars' tableware offerings with hand-painted porcelain and strengthened the company in the Nordic countries and in Asia. In 2015, Fiskars acquired the Waterford Wedgwood Royal Doulton group of companies, with its portfolio of luxury home and lifestyle brands.

In April 2020, Fiskars Group President and CEO Jaana Tuominen stepped down from her position, with CFO Sari Pohjonen appointed as interim CEO. Nathalie Ahlström started as the new President and CEO. The company's net sales had been on a downward trend, and Fiskars did not have a clear growth strategy. At the end of 2021, a new strategy was announced, focusing on five brands – Fiskars, Iittala, Royal Copenhagen, Gerber and Moomin Arabia. The company's main channel was its own channels – shops and online stores.

In 2022, the divestment of the company's American watering business, in other words the Gilmour and Nelson brands, was finished. Fiskars Group's new head office was completed in the spring in Espoo, between the Keilaniemi metro station and the Jokeri Light Rail terminal. In October 2022, Fiskars Group announced that it would make a €10 million renewable energy investment at the Iittala glass factory to replace the factory's existing, natural gas powered furnaces with electric furnaces in order to reduce its annual carbon dioxide emissions by 74 per cent by the end of 2026. In 2022, Fiskars retained its status as the most respected brand in Finland for the fourth consecutive year, according to a survey conducted by the Finnish market research firm Taloustutkimus.

== Modern ==
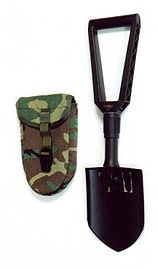
The foldable spade manufactured by Fiskars is used by various militaries.

Fiskars is made up of two strategic business units – SBU Living and SBU Functional. Fiskars' three primary reporting segments are Living, Functional and Other. Fiskars' Other-segment contains the Group's investment portfolio, the real estate unit, corporate headquarters and shared services. In addition, Fiskars reports group-level net sales for three secondary reporting segments – Americas, Europe and Asia-Pacific.

SBU Functional creates tools for use in and around the house and outdoors under brands such as Fiskars and Gerber. SBU Living offers a wide range of products for tabletop, giftware and interior décor under brands such as Iittala, Wedgwood, Waterford, Royal Copenhagen, Arabia, Rörstrand and Royal Doulton.

Fiskars' products are available in more than 100 countries. As of December 2023, the company employs around 7,162 people in 29 countries.

== Financial ==
In 2015, Fiskars recorded net sales of 1,105 million euros and an adjusted operating profit of 65.1 million euros. Cash flow from operating activities was 47.6 million euros.

In 2016, Fiskars recorded net sales of 1,204.6 million euros and an adjusted operating profit of 93.8 million euros. Cash flow from operating activities was 83.8 million euros.
