= Club Car =

American company

Club Car, LLC
- Type: Private
- Industry: Automotive
- Founded: 1958
- Headquarters: Augusta, Georgia, U.S.
- Key people: Craig Scanlon (President & CEO)
- Products: Golf carts, small utility vehicles
- Parent: Platinum Equity
- Website: clubcar.com

Club Car is an American manufacturer of electric and gas-powered golf carts and small utility vehicles for personal and commercial use. Founded in 1958, the company is headquartered in Evans, Georgia, and is one of the largest employers in Columbia County.

The company was acquired by Platinum Equity in 2021, following its tenure as a business unit in Ingersoll Rand corporation's Industrial Technologies division.

== History ==
Club Car was founded in 1958 in Houston, Texas, under the name Landreath Machine. In 1962, the company was purchased by entrepreneur Bill Stevens Jr., who relocated the business to Augusta, Georgia, and renamed it Club Car. The company has maintained its global headquarters in Augusta since that time.

In 1978, a group of eight former EZGO executives acquired Club Car, positioning the company as a local competitor in the golf cart manufacturing industry. Among the new leadership was William Dolan, a co-founder of EZGO.

Club Car was acquired by Ingersoll Rand in 1995 and became part of its Infrastructure division. Club Car was later merged with Bobcat to form a Compact Vehicles Technology division that expanded the company's offerings into utility and commercial vehicles in addition to golf cars. In 2017, Ingersoll Rand purchased GPS Industries which provided fleet management system for Club Car since 2009.

In 2021, Platinum Equity acquired Club Car from Ingersoll Rand in an all-cash transaction valued at $1.68 billion.

Nearly a year later, Club Car announced and subsequently completed the acquisition of Garia, a Danish low-speed electric vehicle manufacturer, which included its subsidiary Melex from Poland—marking the company’s first acquisition under Platinum Equity. The deal extended the company's reach into street-legal Neighborhood Electric Vehicles (NEVs) and lightweight utility vehicles.

Over the years, Club Car expanded its operations footprint globally to accommodate growth and demand for vehicles around the world. In addition to the global corporate headquarters, the company operates two other Georgia based facilities - a distribution center and a production facility. The company also operates facilities in Mielec, Poland and JiaXing, China.

In June 2025, Craig Scanlon was named President and CEO of Club Car.

== Products ==
Club Car produces vehicles for personal use, business and commercial applications, and golf operations.

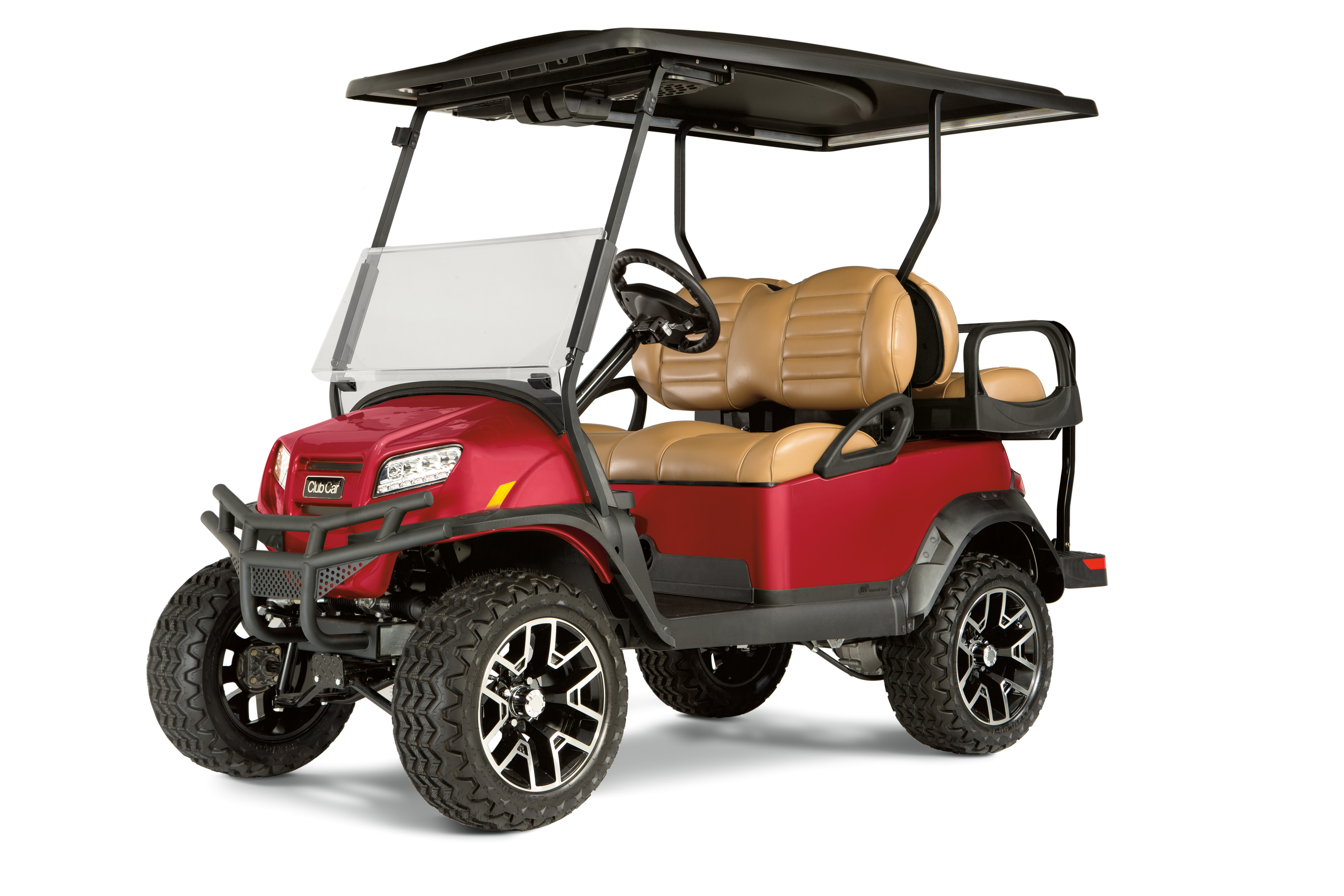
Club Car Onward Lifted 4 Passenger PTV

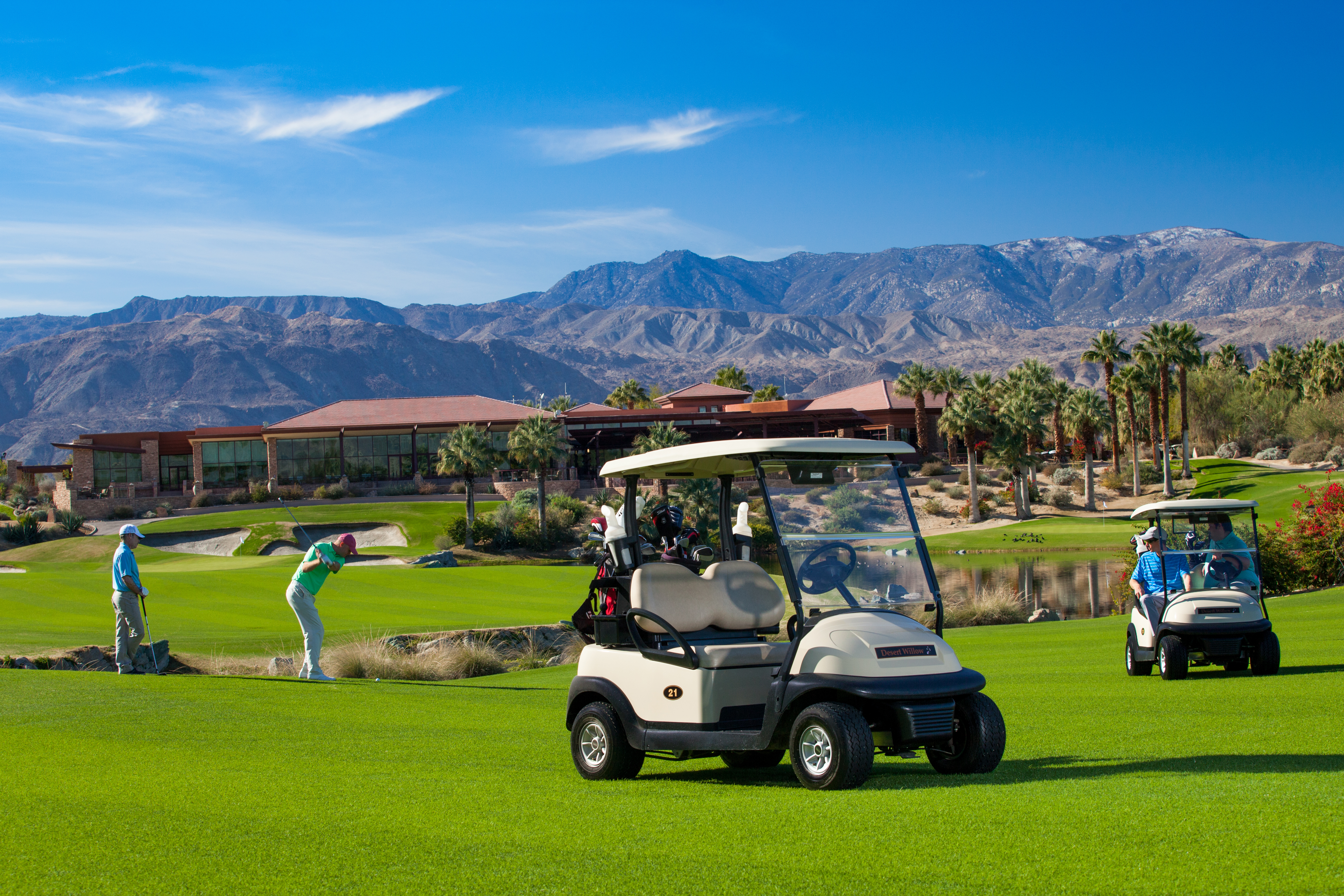
Club Car's Precedent i3, containing Visage technology.

Golf Cart Models by Vertical

Personal	Commercial Utility	Fleet Golf
Onward	Carryall	Tempo
CRU	Urban	Tempo Walk
XRT	Villager	Cafe Express
Certified Pre-Owned	Transporter	Connect

Club Car’s first product was a three-wheeled golf carts introduced in 1958.

The company is regarded as an industry leader involved in many innovations, including producing one of the first street-legal golf carts. It enjoyed newfound success with its DS line of golf cart beginning in 1980. The cart, named after designer Dom Saporito, became the company's hallmark until 2004, when the Precedent line of carts were introduced. The company revealed its next version, the Precedent i2, to critical acclaim, and again in 2008 in an all-new drive system.

The company's partnership with GPSI in 2008 produced the world's first connected golf cart in the Precedent i3, featuring one system to connect an entire golf fleet to the clubhouse and providing new options like score tracking to the golfer. The Precedent i2, i3, and 4Fun were used by golf courses, while the i2 was available for personal use. The Club Car Tempo vehicle launched in 2018 replacing the Precedent.

=== Golf Carts for Personal Use ===
In 2017, the company launched the first of its Onward series of personal transportation vehicles, introducing the ability to customize a vehicle's accessories, color, and more online for the first time. A 2-passenger, 4 passenger, and 4 passenger lifted vehicle were featured in the initial launch, with a 6-passenger and lithium-ion option added later.

Personal Use	Golf Course Use
Onward	Precedent i2
Villager PTV	Precedent i3
Precedent i2	Precedent 4Fun

In 2025, Club Car announced its most advanced personal vehicle yet – the Onward LSV (Low-Speed Vehicle). The Onward LSV standard equipment includes premium features such as a seven-inch touchscreen display, four-wheel brakes, an Occupant Protection System consisting of a reinforced frame, front and rear seatbelts, side mirrors, turn signals, DOT-approved glass windshield, back-up camera and an Acoustic Vehicle Alerting System (AVAS) to enhance pedestrian awareness when the vehicle is in reverse.

Advanced testing for Onward® LSV included automotive style brake performance tests and roof crush test to provide peace of mind to drivers.

=== Personal Utility Vehicles (UTVs) ===
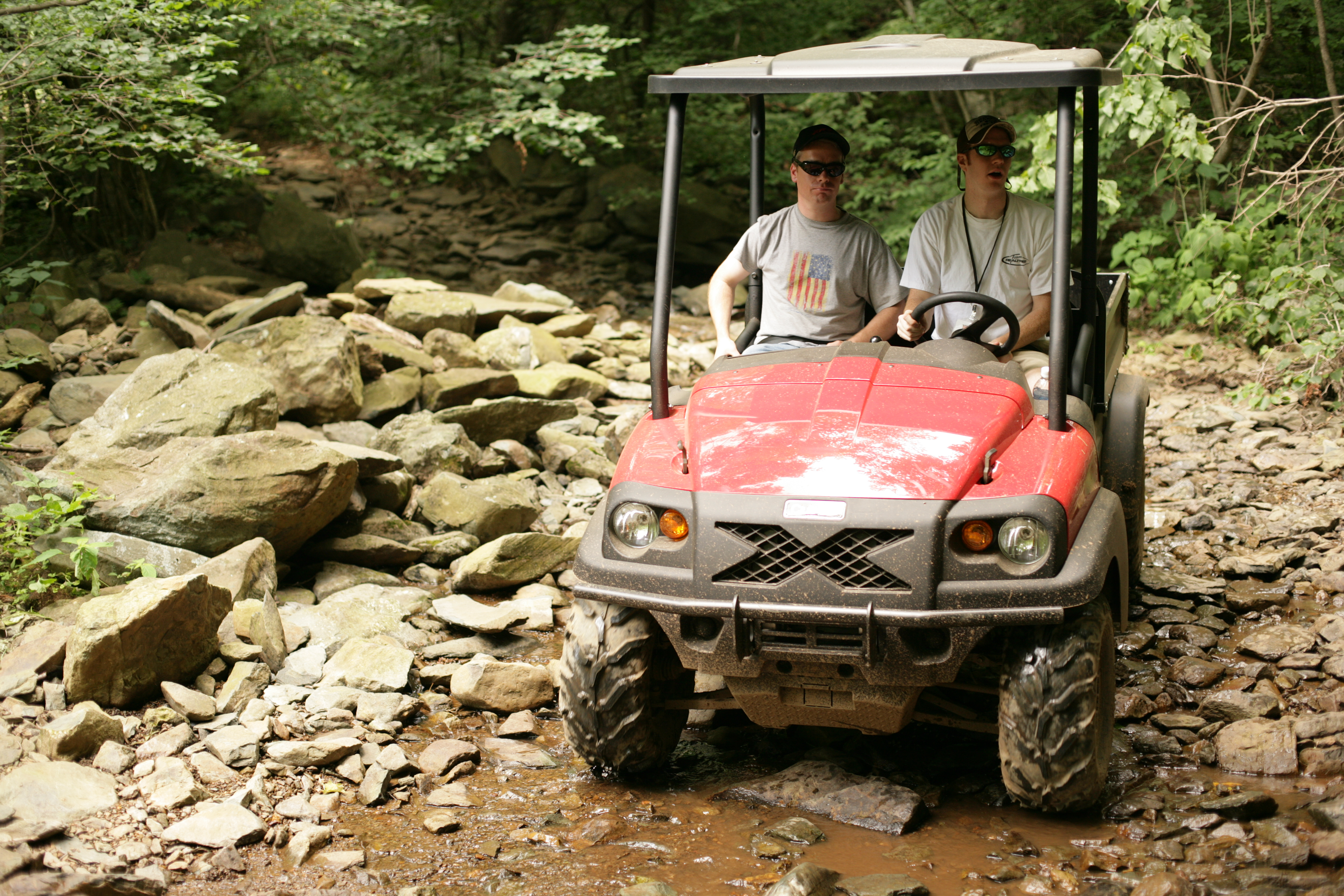
Club Car's XRT1550 4x4 personal utility vehicle (UTV).

Beginning in 2008 and 2009, Club Car entered into the utility vehicles (UTV) market with its XRT line of personal utility vehicles. These ranged from the XRT800 4x2 UTV to XRT1550 4x4 UTV with the ability to add work attachments to the vehicle. Club Car also offers street-legal golf carts with automotive features such as seat belts, turn signals, windshields, and more. These vehicles, UTVs and LSVs, were also manufactured and branded for other companies making Club Car the OEM. The utility line was expanded two years later to include more vehicle options.

4x2	4x4	LSV
XRT 800	XRT 1550	Villager 2
XRT 850	XRT 1550 SE	Villager 2+2
	XRT 1550 with IntelliTach	Villager 2+2 LX

=== Commercial Utility Vehicles (UTVs) ===
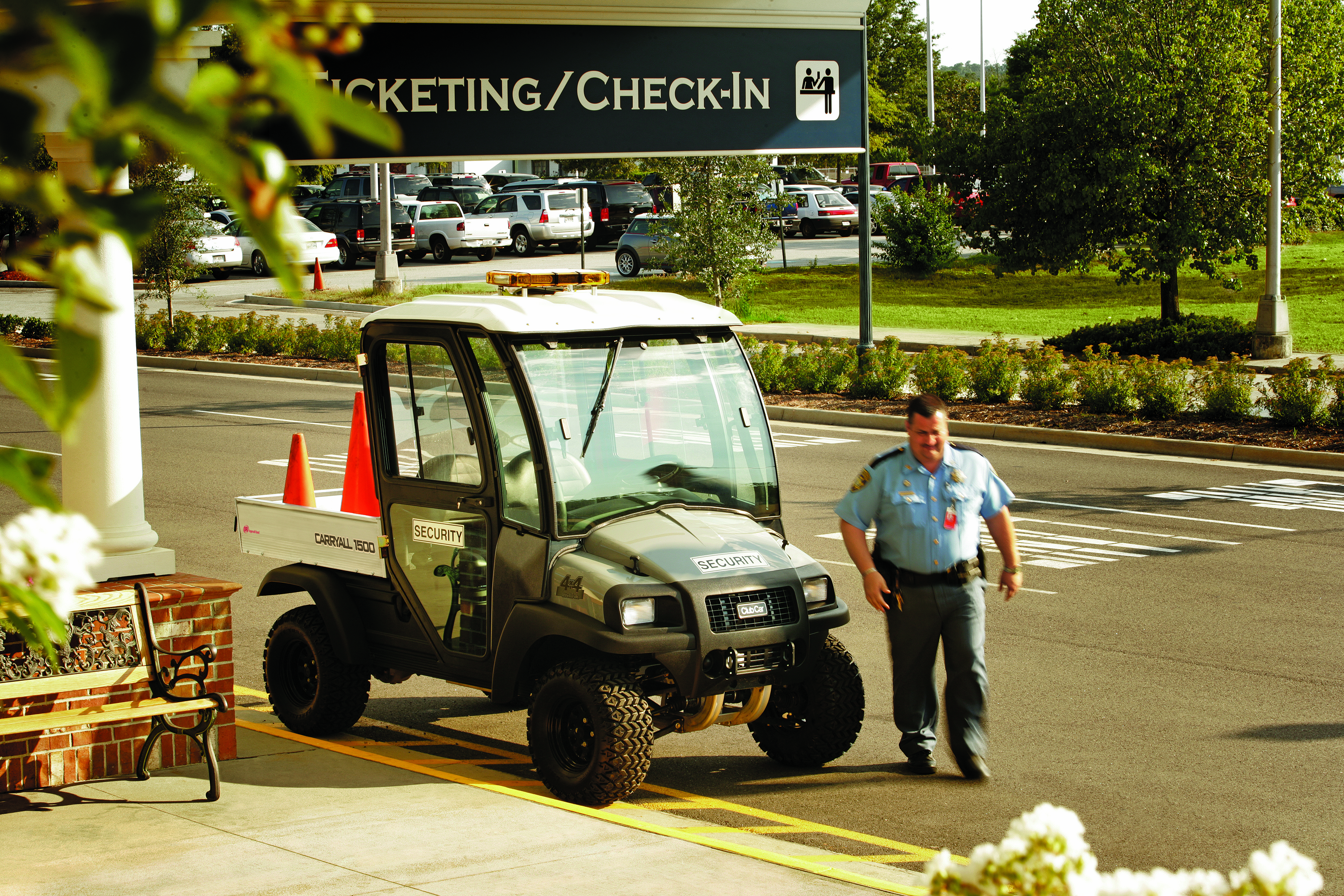
Carryall 1500 4x4 Commercial Utility Vehicle (UTV)

Club Car first began offering UTVs for golf courses by modifying golf carts with holding boxes and other accessories for increased application. They created vehicles targeted at business applications in 1985 with its Carryall II aimed at manufacturing facilities, college campuses, and providing a turf utility vehicle for golf course operations. It became the Carryall series as the company continued producing more vehicle options.

In 2014, the company re-launched its line of commercial utility vehicles with a reintroduction of the Carryall series boasting improved efficiency, a new line of accessories. Two new types of vehicles were developed and launched in 2009 and 2010: street-legal low-speed vehicles (LSV) and vehicles designed for transporting multiple people at resorts, venues, and campuses.

4x2 UTV	4x4 UTV	LSV	Transportation
Carryall 100	Carryall 1500	Carryall 510	Transporter
Carryall 300	Carryall 1500 with IntelliTach	Carryall 710	Villager 4
Carryall 500	Carryall 1700		Villager 6
Carryall 550			Villager 8
Carryall 700			
