= Golf cart =

Small vehicle designed originally to carry golfers

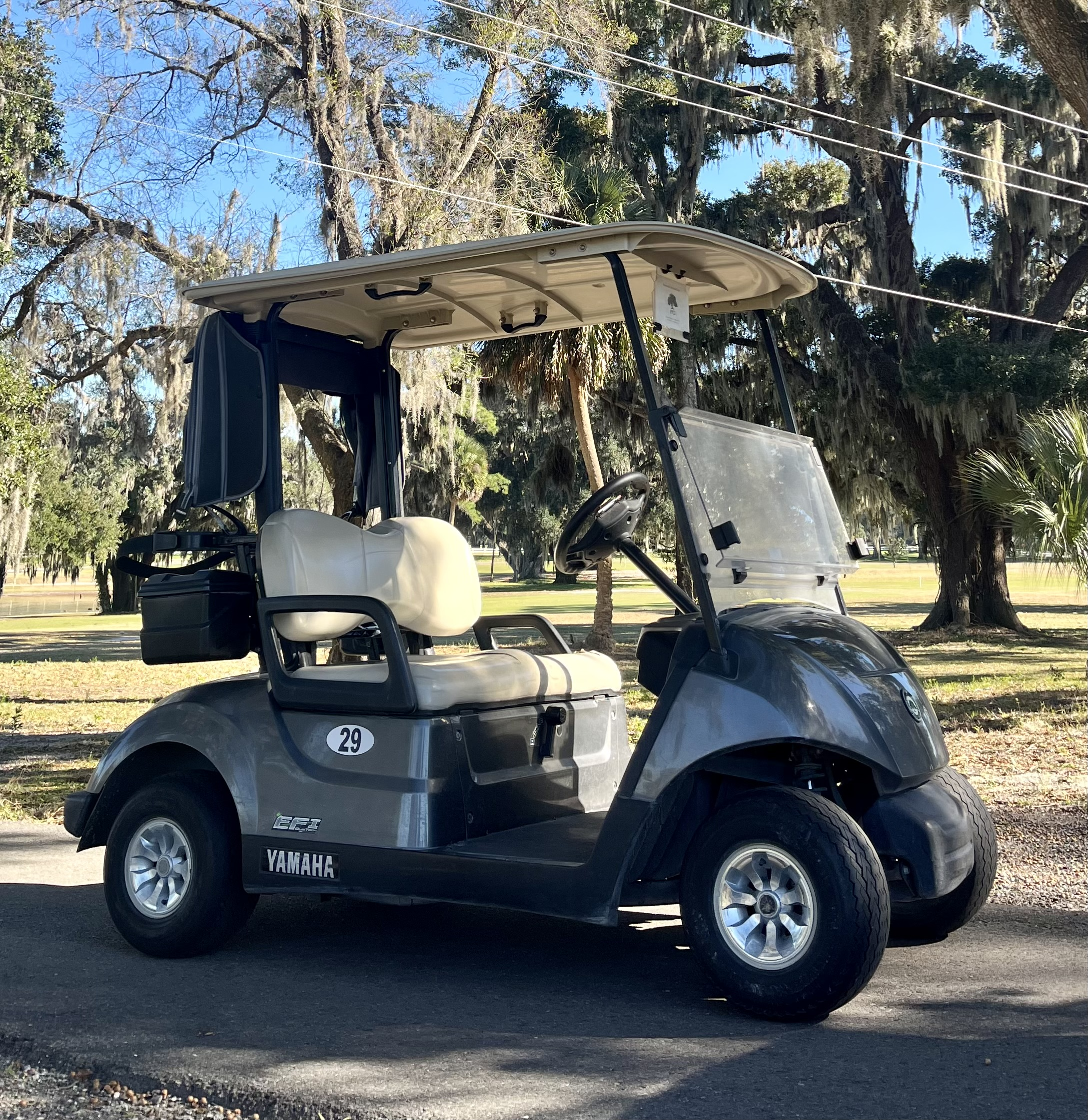
A common golf cart (Yamaha)

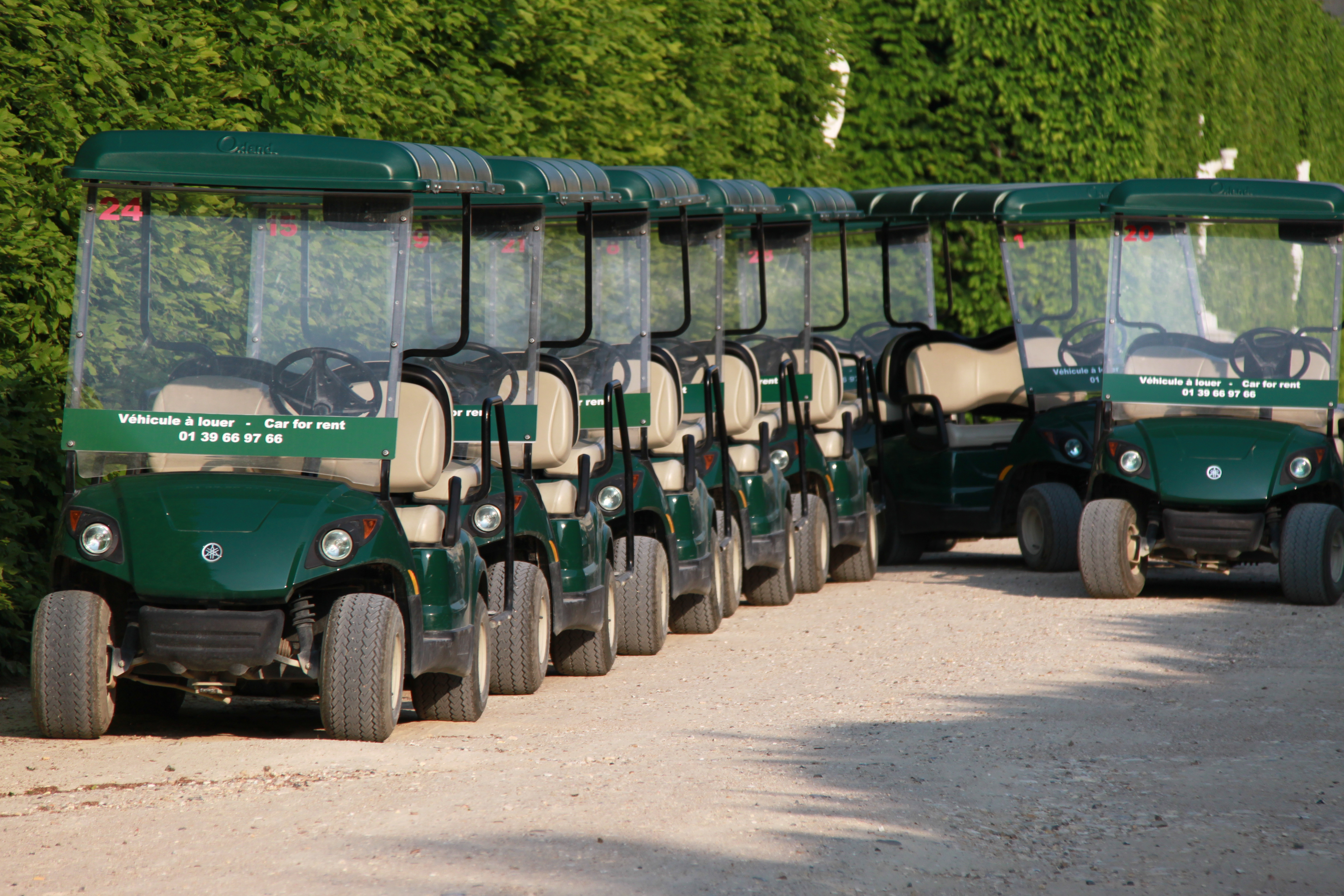
Parked golf cars

A golf cart, golf buggy, or golf car, (Note: Called golf car in American National Standards Institute (ANSI) standard Z130.1, since "carts" are not self-propelled.) is a small motorized vehicle designed originally to carry two golfers and their golf clubs around a golf course with less effort than walking. Over time, variants were introduced that were capable of carrying more passengers, had additional utility features, or were certified as a street legal low-speed vehicle.

A traditional golf cart, capable of carrying two golfers and their clubs, is generally around 4 feet (1.2 m) wide, 8 feet (2.4 m) long and 6 feet (1.8 m) high, weighing between 900 and 1,000 pounds (410 and 450 kg) and capable of speeds up to about 15 miles per hour (24 km/h). (Note: As defined in ANSI standard Z130.1.) The golf carts usually have four wheels, although the three-wheeled autoettes were marketed, among other uses, for golfing.

== History ==
Reportedly, the first use of a motorized cart on a golf course was by JK Wadley of Texarkana, who saw a three-wheeled electric cart being used in Los Angeles to transport senior citizens to a grocery store. Later, he purchased a cart and found that it worked poorly on a golf course. The first electric golf cart was custom-made in 1932, but did not gain widespread acceptance. In the 1930s until the 1950s the most widespread use of golf carts was for those with disabilities who could not walk far. By the mid-1950s the golf cart had gained wide acceptance with US golfers.

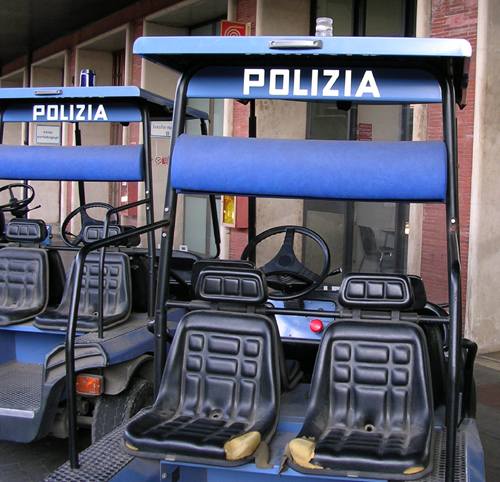
Italian State Police golf carts at Venice Railway Station

Merle Williams of Long Beach, California, was an early innovator of the electric golf cart. He started with knowledge gained from the production of electric cars due to World War II gasoline rationing. In 1951 his Marketeer Company began production of an electric golf cart in Redlands, California. E-Z-Go began producing golf cars in 1954, Cushman in 1955, Club Car in 1958, Taylor-Dunn in 1961, Harley-Davidson in 1963, Melex in 1971, Yamaha Golf Car in 1979 and CT&T in 2002.

Max Walker created the first gasoline-powered golf cart "The Walker Executive" in 1957. This three-wheeled vehicle was shaped with a Vespa-style front end and carried two passengers and golf bags.

In 1963 the Harley-Davidson Motor Company began producing golf carts. Over the years they manufactured and distributed thousands of three-wheeled and four-wheeled vehicles. Harley-Davidson sold the production of golf carts to American Machine and Foundry Company, who in turn sold production to Columbia Par Car.

A golf cart crossing a bridge in Kanagawa, Japan

== Types of golf carts ==
=== Utility vehicle ===
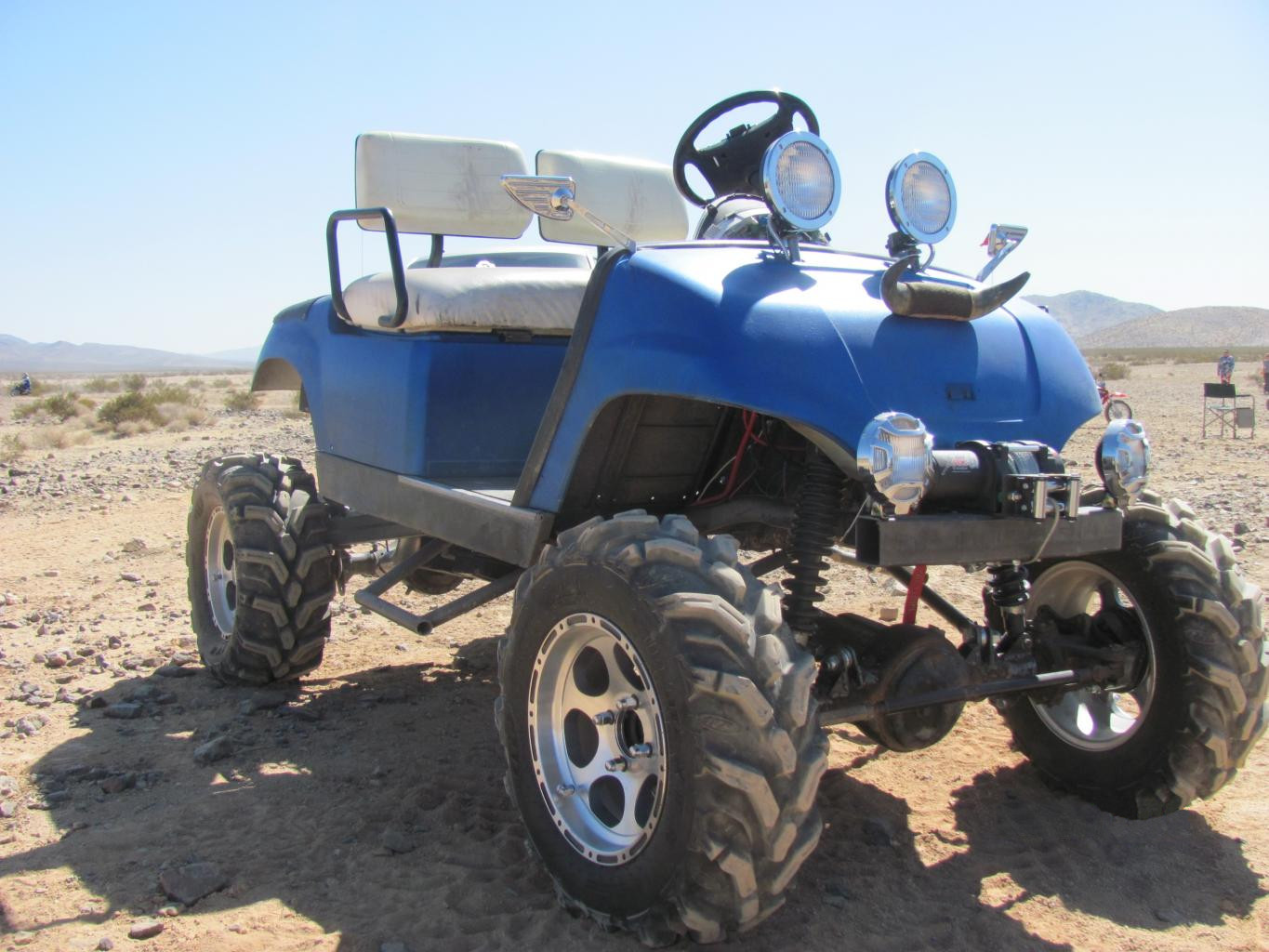
Dune buggy using a golf cart body

Many golf cart manufacturers offer models configured as small utility vehicles (UTV), a type of side-by-side. Originally developed for golf course operations, these UTVs were available with small pickup beds, flatbeds, dump style beds, van boxes, or with coolers and cabinets for drink and snack sales. With the growing popularity of the side-by-side, many manufacturers are now offering models equipped for use on rugged, off-road terrain.

=== Transport vehicles ===
Many golf cart manufacturers offer models configured as transportation vehicles, with no provision to carry golf bags. These vehicles are often used in low-speed, off-road applications such as on school campuses, resort properties, or inside airport terminals. These transport variants can range from a simple conversion of a traditional golf cart, swapping the golf bag carrier for a second rear-facing seat, to a stretched cart offering additional rows of seating for 4, 6, or 8 people.

=== Solar-powered golf carts ===
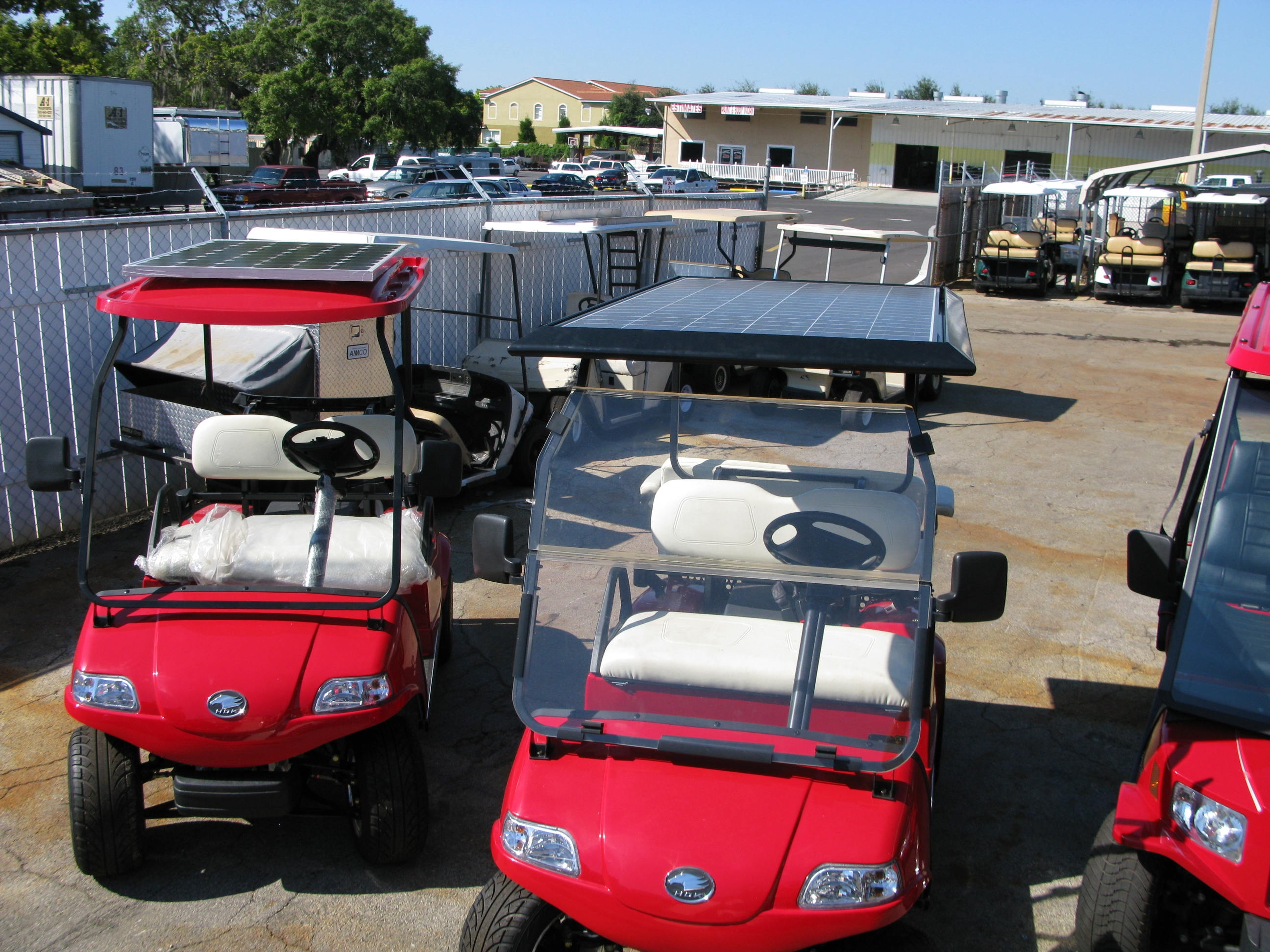
Helios Chargers, 130 watts and 205 watts, on solar powered golf carts

Solar golf carts are powered by mounting a photovoltaic panel on top of the cart. A controller converts the sun's energy to charge the cart's battery pack. Not only does the solar power take the cart off the electric grid, it also increases the driving distance.

Solar conversion kits have been available for golf carts and low-speed vehicles (LSV) for several years. These kits range from low wattage solar battery chargers to a 410-watt array on an 8-passenger transport cart. Kits utilizing flexible solar panels are often preferred on golf carts due to their light weight and ability to conform to the shape of the cart roof. Buyers can take a solar tax credit of 30% of the purchase price on their US Federal Income Tax.

Solar-powered golf carts are popular with owners who drive long distances, such as maintenance workers, golf course fleets, staff at the Detroit Zoo, transportation vehicles in resorts and cities, and drivers of VIP carts on college campuses. High schools have used them as teaching tools for solar power.

== Golf cart communities ==
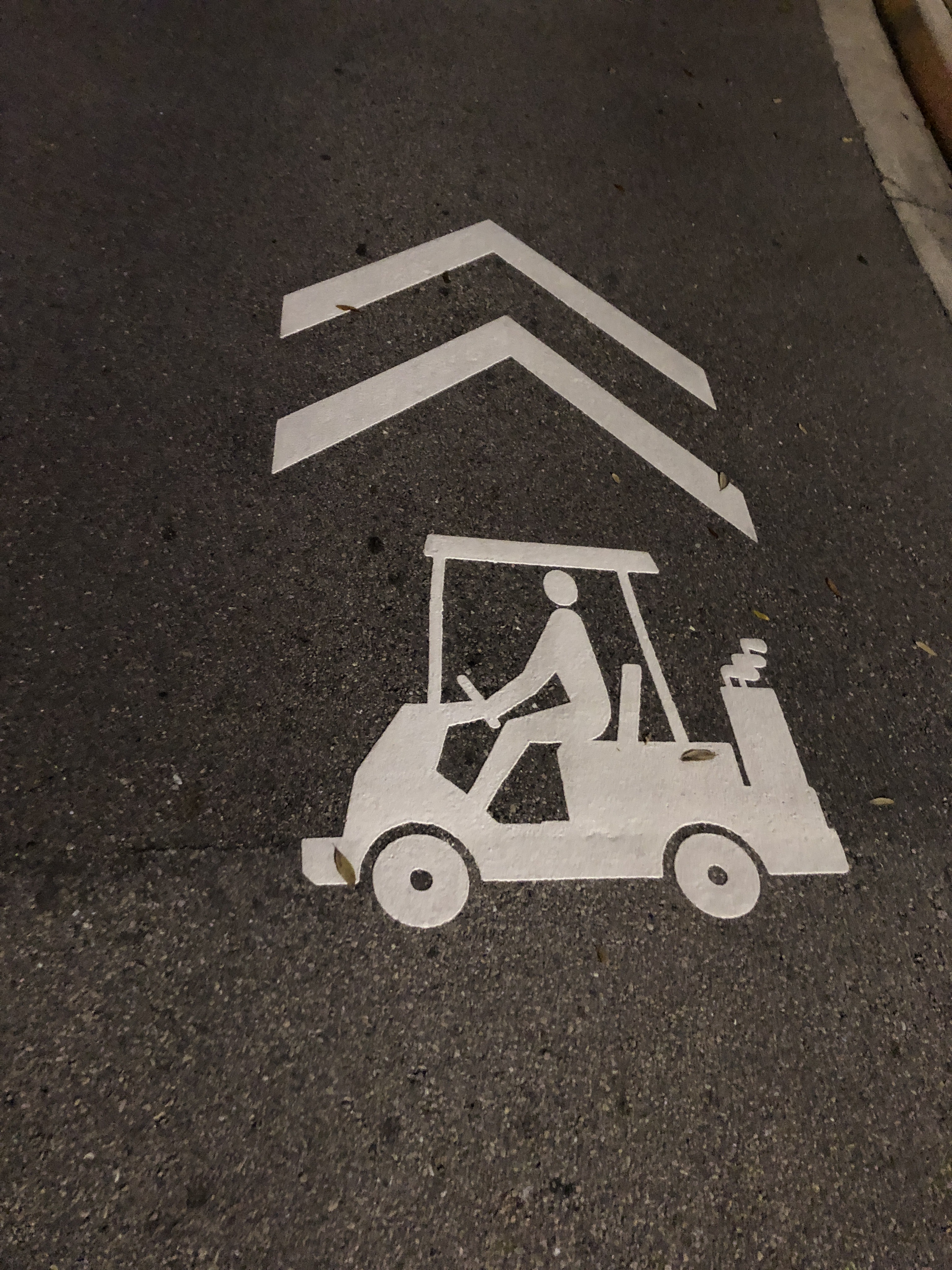
Shared lane markings indicating that golf carts share the road in Ave Maria, Florida

- Peachtree City, Georgia, United States, has many miles of golf cart paths that link the city together. Children aged twelve or over may operate a cart on Peachtree City cart paths with a parent, grandparent, or guardian in the front seat. Unaccompanied fifteen-year-olds with valid Georgia learner's permits can operate golf carts alone. Golf cart travel is used by a great majority of the community, especially among high school students. McIntosh High School and Starr's Mill High School have student golf cart parking lots on their campuses.
- On certain islands (such as Santa Catalina Island, California; Bald Head Island, North Carolina; North Captiva Island, Florida; and Hamilton Island, Queensland, Australia), motor vehicles are sometimes restricted, and residents use golf carts instead.
- The Villages, Florida, a retirement community of over 140,000 people, has an extensive golf cart trail system (estimated at 100 miles (160 km)) and also allows golf carts on many streets. It is the most popular form of transportation in this community.
- On the tropical islands of Belize, golf carts are a significant form of road transport and can be rented by tourists.
- The residential community of Discovery Bay, Hong Kong does not allow the use of private vehicles apart from a fleet of 520 golf carts (excluding the ones operating exclusively in the Golf or the Marina Clubs). The remainder of the 20,000 residents rely on a mixture of shuttle buses and hire cars to travel around the township.
- The Palm Springs Area in California contains multiple golf cart communities, including PGA West, The Madison Club, The Hideaway, and many other golf course/golf cart communities. The PGA Tour is held at PGA West every January.

== Safety ==
Along with the rising frequency of golf cart crashes, the number of golf-cart-related injuries has increased significantly over the last decades. A study conducted by researchers in the Center for Injury Research and Policy of The Research Institute at the Nationwide Children's Hospital found that the number of golf cart-related injuries rose 132% during the 17-year study period. According to the study, published in the July 2008 issue of the American Journal of Preventive Medicine, there were an estimated 148,000 golf cart-related injuries between 1990 and 2006, ranging from an estimated 5,770 cases in 1990 to approximately 13,411 cases in 2006. More than 30% of golf cart-related injuries involved children under the age of 16.

The most common type of injury was soft tissue damage, usually just bruises, followed by fractures, constituting 22.3% of the cases, and lacerations, accounting for 15.5% of injuries. Other types of injuries include concussions, internal injuries, subdural hematoma, spinal cord injury, or acute respiratory compromise. While rare, a few cases had severe outcomes: 4 fatalities, 2 paraplegic, and 1 quadriplegic injuries have been documented.

More recent analyses of emergency department data continue to show that fractures, head injuries and ejection-related injuries remain among the most common outcome of golf cart incidents.

Some of the main causes of injury related to golf cart accidents included cart overturn, falling/jumping from a moving golf cart, collision with another vehicle or stationary object, struck/run over by a cart, getting into or out of a moving cart. Out of all these, "falling or jumping from a golf cart" was the most common cause of injury for both adults and children.

One contributing reason is that current golf cart safety features are insufficient to prevent passenger falls or ejection. Golf carts moving at speeds as low as 11 miles per hour (18 km/h) could readily eject a passenger during a turn. Furthermore, rear-facing golf cart seats are associated with high rates of passenger ejection during fast acceleration, and most standard (stock) golf carts do not have brakes on all four wheels (typically brakes are only on the rear wheels, thus sharply limiting their braking power).

== Legislation ==
Arizona has a large snowbird population, and many of them live in large RV parks or retirement communities that use golf carts to get around. In 2014, Arizona Governor Jan Brewer signed a law permitting golf cart drivers to drive as close to the right-hand edge of the roadway as possible. Prior to the passage of the law, golf cart drivers received traffic tickets for failing to drive in the center of the roadway. Complementing the new law, a golf cart safety education program was initiated.

In May 2025, South Carolina introduced a law allowing the carts to be driven on public highways within 4 miles (6.4 km) of the driver's home, at a maximum speed of 35 miles per hour (56 km/h).

== Rail carts ==
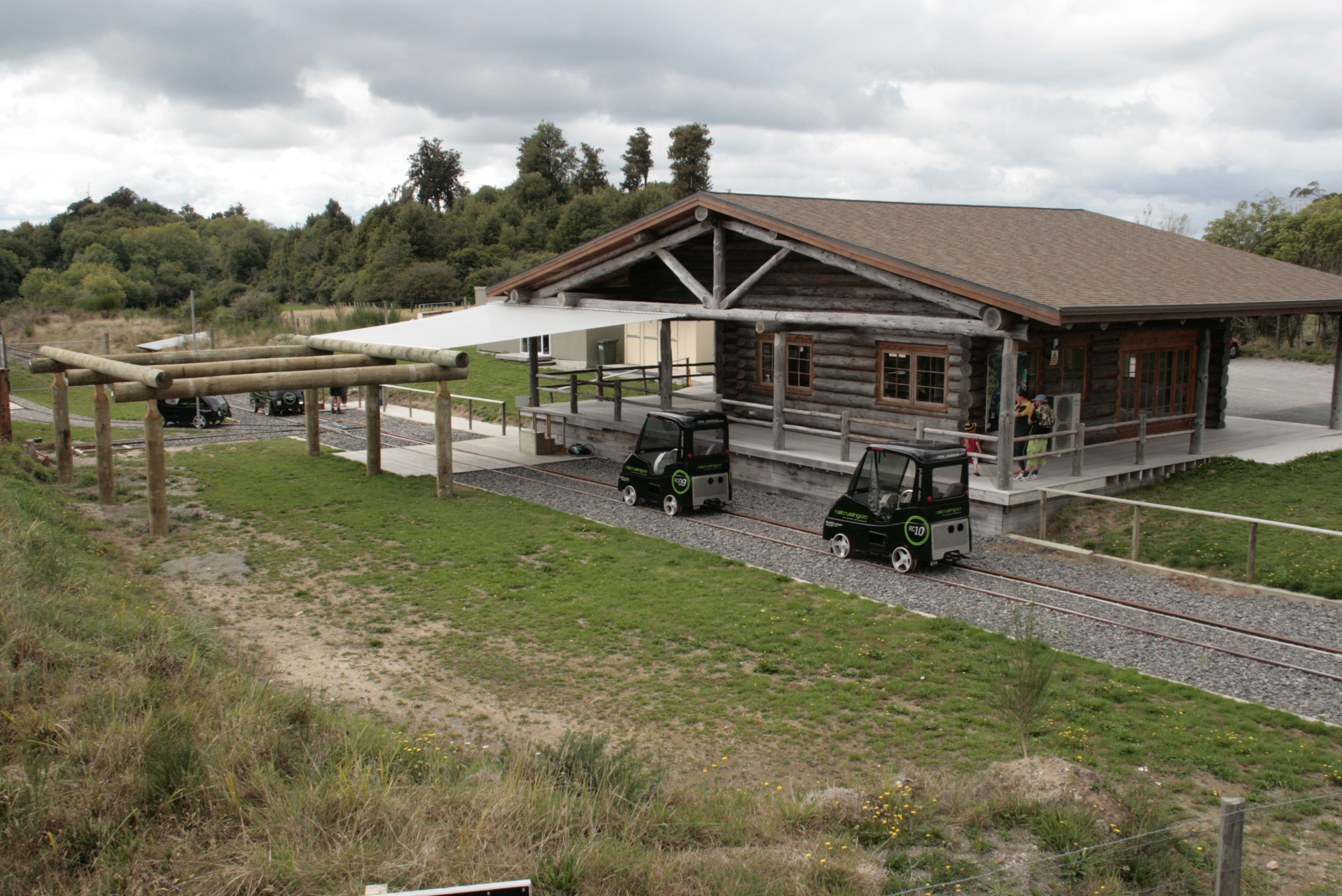
Mamaku - RailCruiser carts in 2013

Petrol powered golf carts have been converted with rail wheels for carrying passengers at up to 25 km/h (16 mph) on several former railways. Awakeri Rail Adventures operate carts on a 10 km (6.2 mi) part of the former Tāneatua branch, Forgotten World Adventures on 142 km (88 mi) of the former Stratford–Okahukura Line, and Dargaville Rail Carts on a 15 km (9.3 mi) section of the rail track from Dargaville branch to Tangowahine. Similar vehicles are run by Andrews Valley Rail Tours on 4.3 mi (6.9 km) of the Murphy Branch at Andrews and RailCruiser from Tārukenga, 20 km (12 mi) to Mamaku on the former Rotorua branch.

== See also ==
- Electric car
- Electric vehicle
- Microvan
- Neighborhood Electric Vehicle
- Side-by-side (vehicle)
