= Le Cheylas =

- Commune
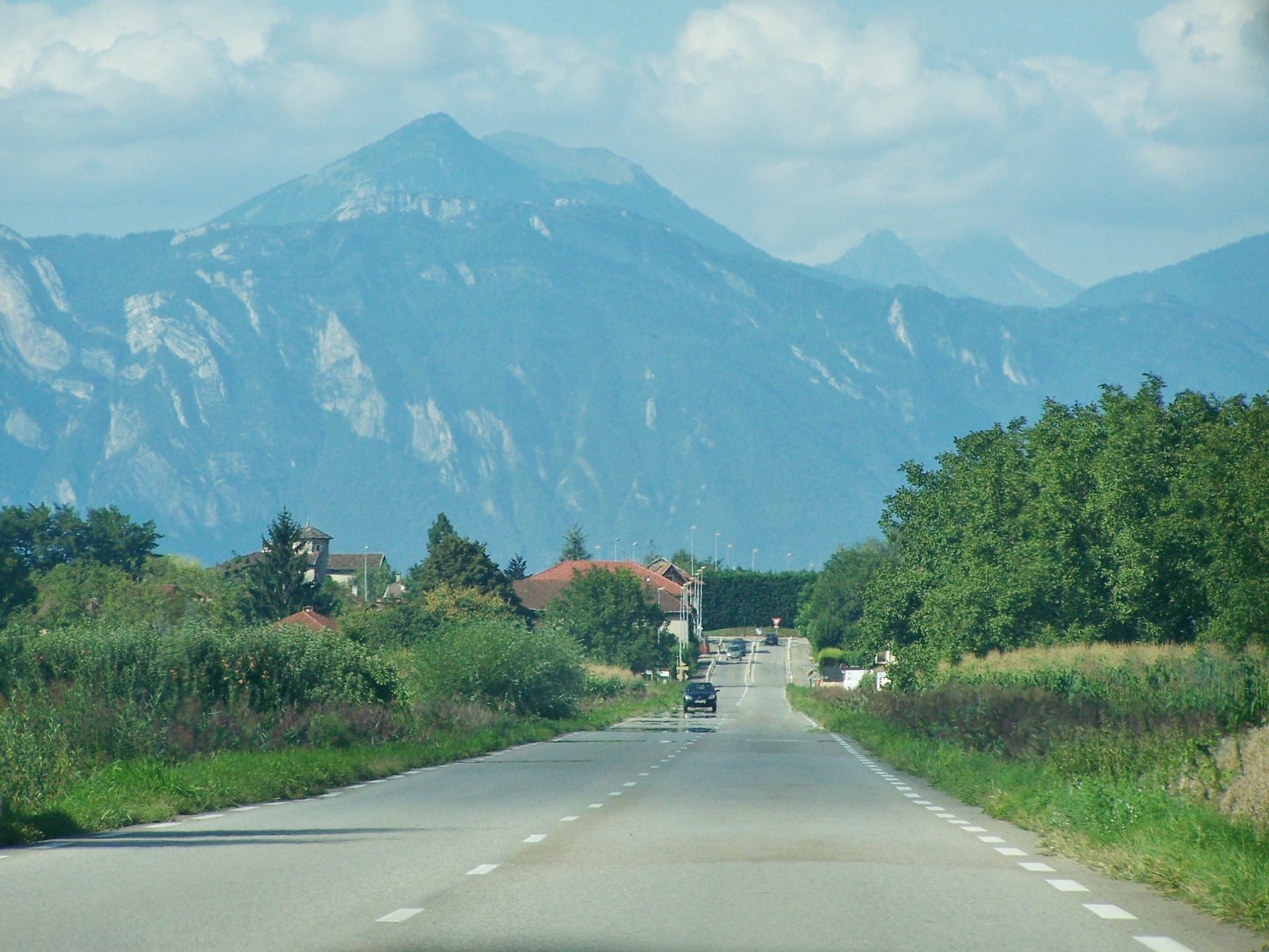
- The D523 road in Le Cheylas
- Location of Le Cheylas
- Location within France Location within Auvergne-Rhône-Alpes
- Coordinates: 45°22′20″N 5°59′36″E
- Country: France
- Region: Auvergne-Rhône-Alpes
- Department: Isère
- Arrondissement: Grenoble
- Canton: Le Haut-Grésivaudan
- Intercommunality: CC Le Grésivaudan

Government
  - Mayor (2020–2026): Roger Cohard
- Area^{1}: 8 km^{2} (3.1 sq mi)
- Elevation: 245 m (804 ft)
- Highest elevation: 1,202 m (3,944 ft)
- Lowest elevation: 240 m (790 ft)
- Population (2023): 2,389
  - Density: 300/km^{2} (770/sq mi)
- Time zone: UTC+01:00 (CET)
  - Summer (DST): UTC+02:00 (CEST)
- INSEE/Postal code: 38100 /38570
- ^{1} French Land Register data, which excludes lakes, ponds, glaciers > 1 km^{2} (0.386 sq mi or 247 acres) and river estuaries.

Le Cheylas (French pronunciation: [lə ʃela]) is a commune in the Isère department in southeastern France.

== Population ==
Historical population

Year	Pop.	±% p.a.
1793	451	—
1800	577	+3.58%
1806	588	+0.32%
1821	718	+1.34%
1831	650	−0.99%
1836	810	+4.50%
1841	805	−0.12%
1846	773	−0.81%
1851	796	+0.59%
1856	818	+0.55%
1861	793	−0.62%
1866	803	+0.25%
1872	772	−0.65%
1876	782	+0.32%
1881	823	+1.03%
1886	781	−1.04%
1891	716	−1.72%
1896	675	−1.17%
1901	613	−1.91%

Year	Pop.	±% p.a.
1906	583	−1.00%
1911	525	−2.07%
1921	546	+0.39%
1926	610	+2.24%
1931	720	+3.37%
1936	749	+0.79%
1946	792	+0.56%
1954	838	+0.71%
1962	941	+1.46%
1968	1,110	+2.79%
1975	1,173	+0.79%
1982	1,311	+1.60%
1990	1,567	+2.25%
1999	2,118	+3.40%
2007	2,655	+2.86%
2012	2,680	+0.19%
2017	2,566	−0.87%
2023	2,389	−1.18%

Source: EHESS and INSEE (1968-2023)

== Twin towns – sister cities ==
Le Cheylas is twinned with:

- Pavarolo, Italy (1995)

== See also ==
- Communes of the Isère department
