= Harradine =

Harradine is a habitational surname (from places called Harrowden). Notable people with the surname include:

- Benn Harradine (born 1982), Australian discus thrower
- Brian Harradine (1935–2014), Australian politician
- Leslie Harradine (1887–1965), English sculptor and potter
