= John Bennett (potter) =

British ceramic artist

- Born: John Bennett; March 22, 1840; Burslem, England
- Died: February 24, 1907 (aged 66); West Orange, New Jersey
- Resting place: Rosedale Cemetery
- Known for: Ceramics
- Movement: Aestheticism, Arts and Crafts Movement

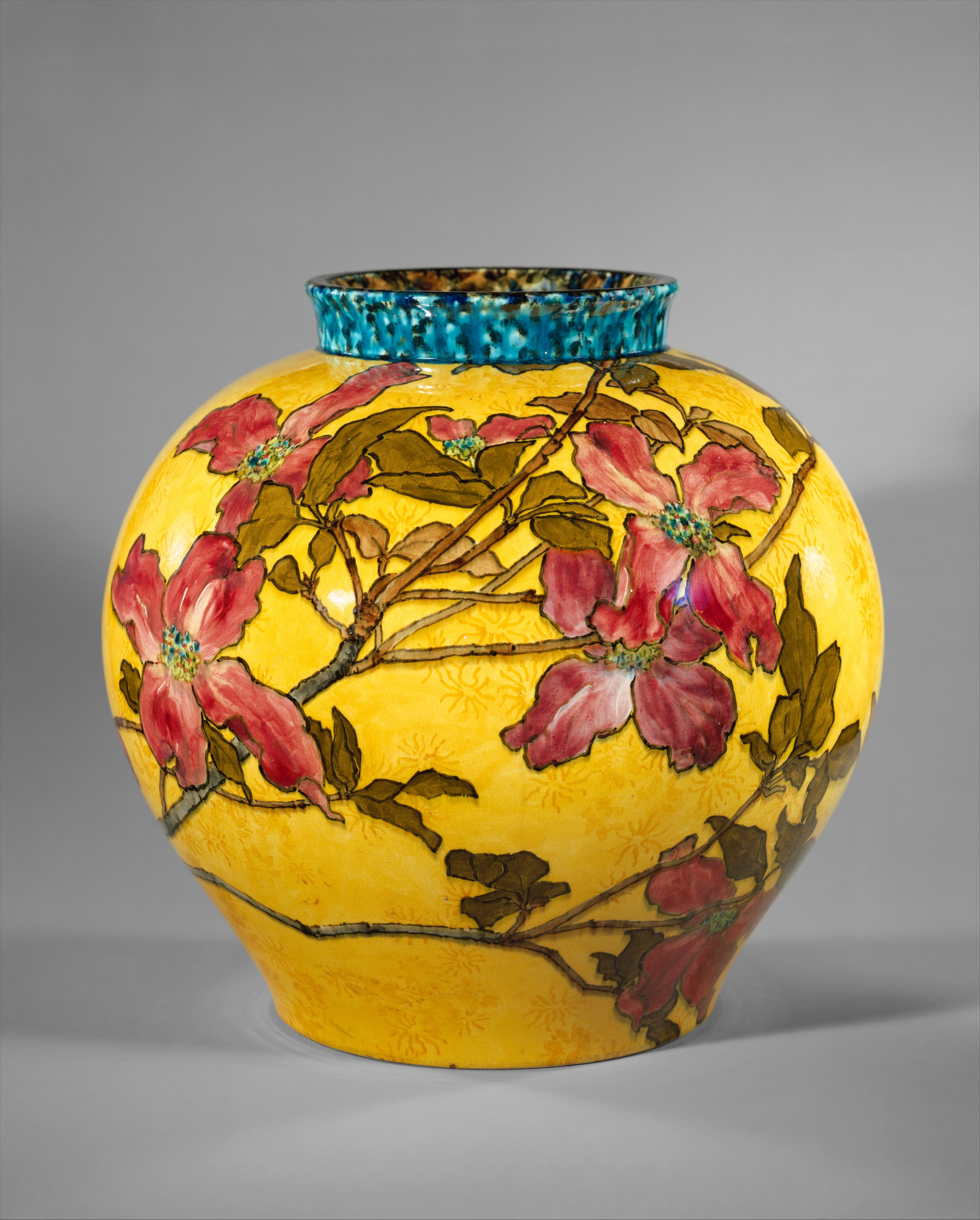
John Bennett, glazed earthenware vase, 1882

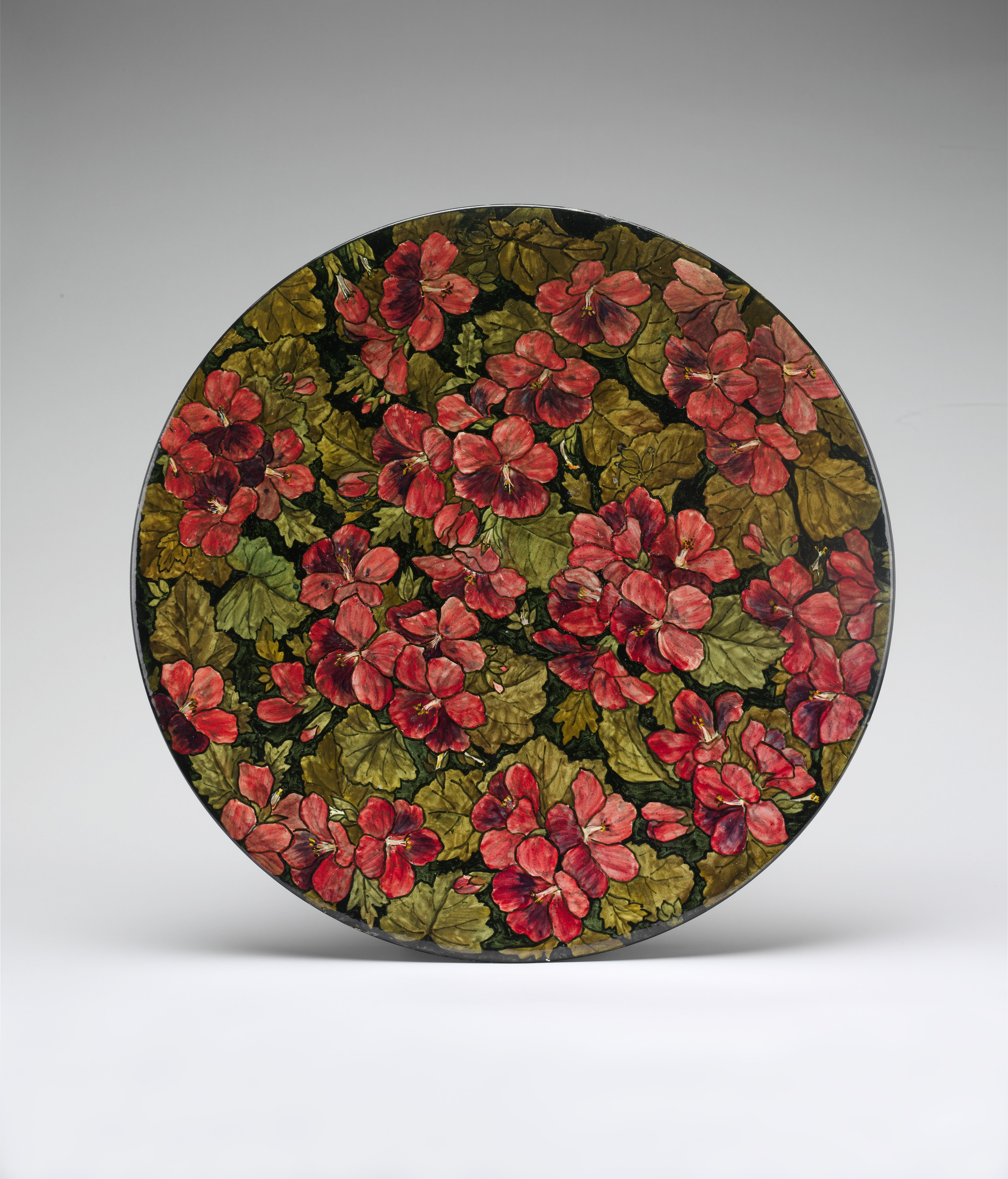
John Bennett, glazed earthenware plaque, 1889

John Bennett (1840-1907) was a British-American ceramic artist who spent much of his career in America. He is known for decorative glazed earthenware with natural motifs.

== Career ==
Bennett came from Burslem, Staffordshire. In the 1870s, he was the director of the "Lambeth faience", that is, "art" stoneware, department at Doulton & Co. in London. Around 1876, he immigrated to America and started his own ceramic business in New York City. His work soon became sought after for its high quality and painterly style. He closed the New York business in 1882 and retired to a farm in West Orange, New Jersey, in part to spend more time with his family. Pottery that he made at the farm is stamped "W. Orange - N.J.". He also turned to painting and sketching and gave private art classes.

Bennett's pieces of glazed earthenware include vases and plates, often decorated with highly colored, asymmetrical designs of flowers and other motifs from nature. His style is influenced by oriental pottery, the Aesthetic Movement, and the Arts and Crafts movement.

His work is in the collection of the Metropolitan Museum of Art, the Carnegie Museum of Art, the Boston Museum of Fine Arts, the Brooklyn Museum, and numerous other museums and art institutions.

== Personal life ==
He married Mary Hall (1846–1928). He is buried in Rosedale Cemetery in West Orange with his wife and daughters Sarah and Mary.
