= Royal Doulton =

British ceramics manufacturing company

- Industry: Pottery
- Predecessors: Jones, Watts & Doulton (1815); Doulton & Watts (1820); Doulton & Co. (1853)
- Founded: 1815; 211 years ago
- Founders: John Doulton; Martha Jones; John Watts
- Headquarters: Stoke-on-Trent, England
- Key people: Henry Doulton
- Products: Ceramics, home accessories
- Parent: WWRD Holdings Limited
- Website: royaldoulton.com

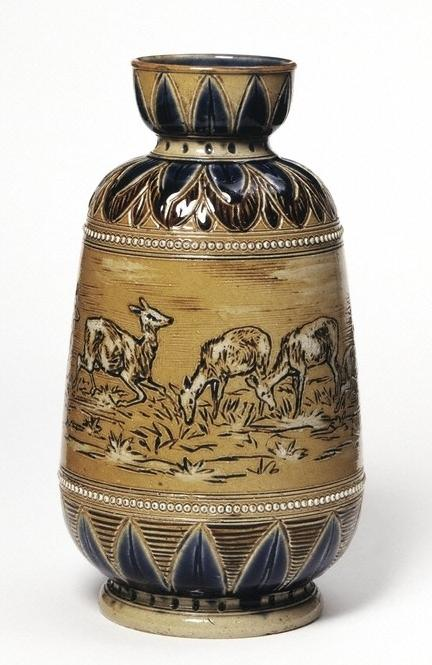
Salt-glazed stoneware vase, 1874, incised decoration by Hannah Barlow in Lambeth

Royal Doulton is an English ceramic and home accessories manufacturer that was founded in 1815. Originally based in Vauxhall, London, and later moving to Lambeth, in 1882 it opened a factory in Burslem, Stoke-on-Trent, the centre of English pottery. From the start, the main products the business made were utilitarian wares, mostly stonewares, including storage jars, tankards and the like, and later expanding to drain pipes, lavatories, water filters, electrical porcelain and other ceramics. From 1853 to 1901, its wares were marked Doulton & Co., then from 1901, when a royal warrant was given, Royal Doulton.

It also made more decorative wares, initially mostly stoneware, and from the 1860s, the firm made considerable efforts to get a reputation for design, in which it was largely successful, as one of the first British makers of art pottery. Initially this was done at Lambeth, and subsequently at the Burslem factory, which was mainly intended for making bone china tablewares and decorative items. It was a latecomer in this market compared to firms such as Royal Crown Derby, Royal Worcester, Wedgwood, Spode and Mintons, but made a place for itself in the later 19th century. Today Royal Doulton mainly produces tableware and figurines, but also cookware, glassware, and other home accessories such as linens, curtains and lighting.

Three of its brands were Royal Doulton, Royal Albert, and (after a post-WWII merger) Mintons. These brands are now owned by WWRD Holdings Limited (Waterford Crystal, Wedgwood, Royal Doulton), based in Barlaston near Stoke-on-Trent. On 2 July 2015, the acquisition of WWRD by the Finnish company Fiskars Corporation was completed.

== History – 19th century ==
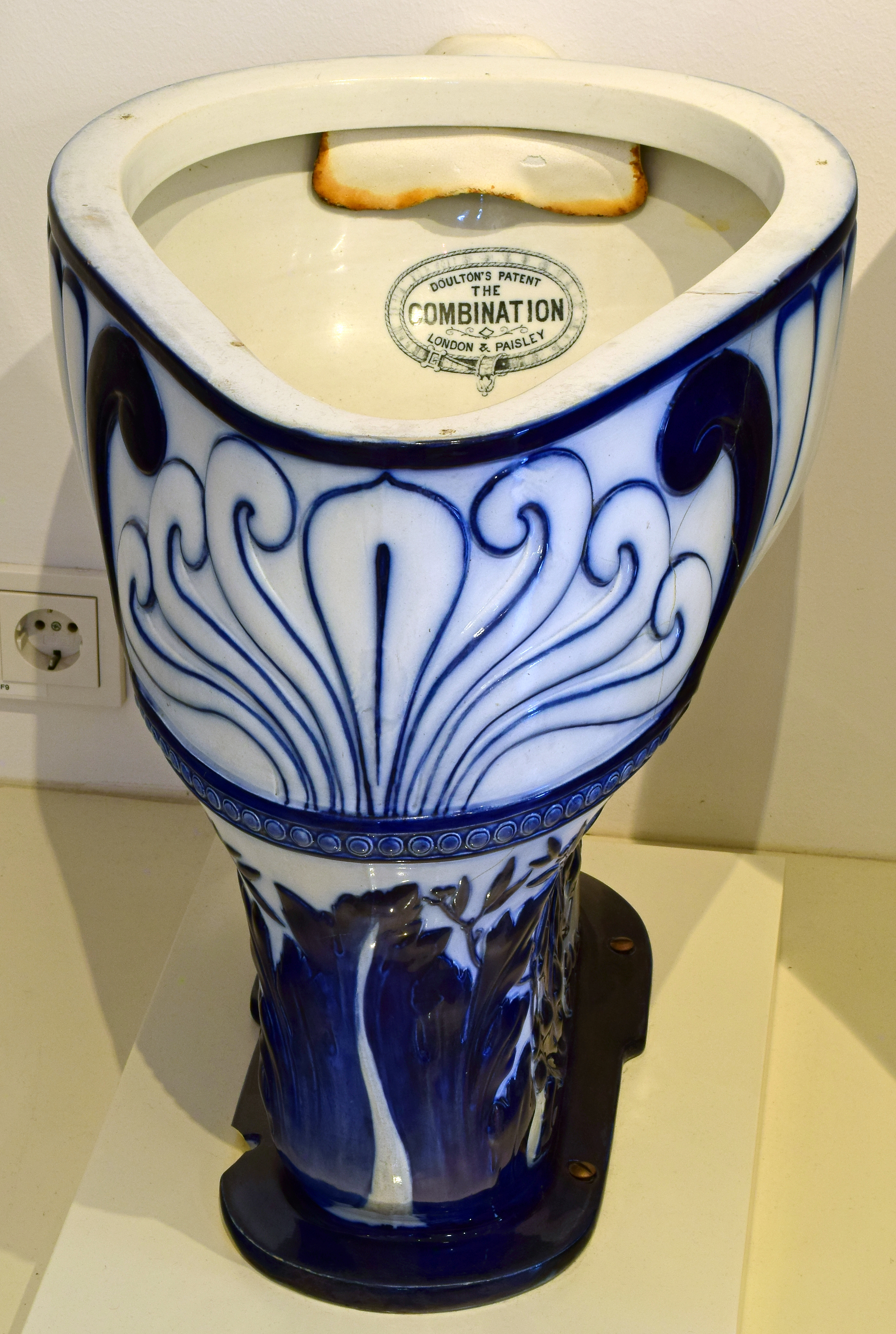
Decorated lavatory, late 19th century

The Royal Doulton company began as a partnership between John Doulton, Martha Jones, and John Watts, as Doulton bought (with £100) an interest in an existing factory at Vauxhall Walk, Lambeth, London, where Watts was the foreman. They traded as Jones, Watts & Doulton from 1815 until Martha Jones left the partnership in 1820, when the trade name was changed to Doulton & Watts. The business specialised in making salt glaze stoneware, including utilitarian or decorative bottles, jugs and jars, much of it intended for inns and pubs. In 1826 they took over a larger existing pottery on Lambeth High Street.

The company took the name Doulton & Co. in 1854 after the retirement of John Watts in 1853, and a merger with Henry Doulton and Co. (see below), although the trading name of Doulton & Watts continued to be used for decades. For some of the 19th century there were three different businesses, run by the sons of John Doulton, and perhaps with cross-ownership, which later came back together by the end of the century. By 1897 the total employees exceeded 4,000.

=== Pipes and other utilitarian wares ===
Manufacturing of ceramic sewage pipes began in 1846, and was highly successful; Henry Doulton set up his own company specialising in this, Henry Doulton and Co., the first business to make these. This merged with the main business in 1854. His brother John Junior also later set up his own pipe-making business. Previously sewers were just channels made of brick, which began to leak as they aged. The 1846–1860 cholera pandemic, and the tracing by Dr John Snow of the 1854 Broad Street cholera outbreak in London to a water supply contaminated by sewage led to a huge programme of improving sewage disposal, and other forms of drainage using pipes. These and an expanding range of builder's and bathroom fixtures and products remained important product categories for Doulton into the 20th century. Metal plumbing items such as taps and cast iron baths were added to the range later. Kitchen stonewares such as storage jars and mixing bowls, and laboratory and manufacturing ceramics, were other long-standing specialities. Further facilities were set up for making these in Paisley in Scotland, Smethwick, St Helens near Liverpool, Rowley Regis in England, and eventually Paris.

=== Decorative wares ===
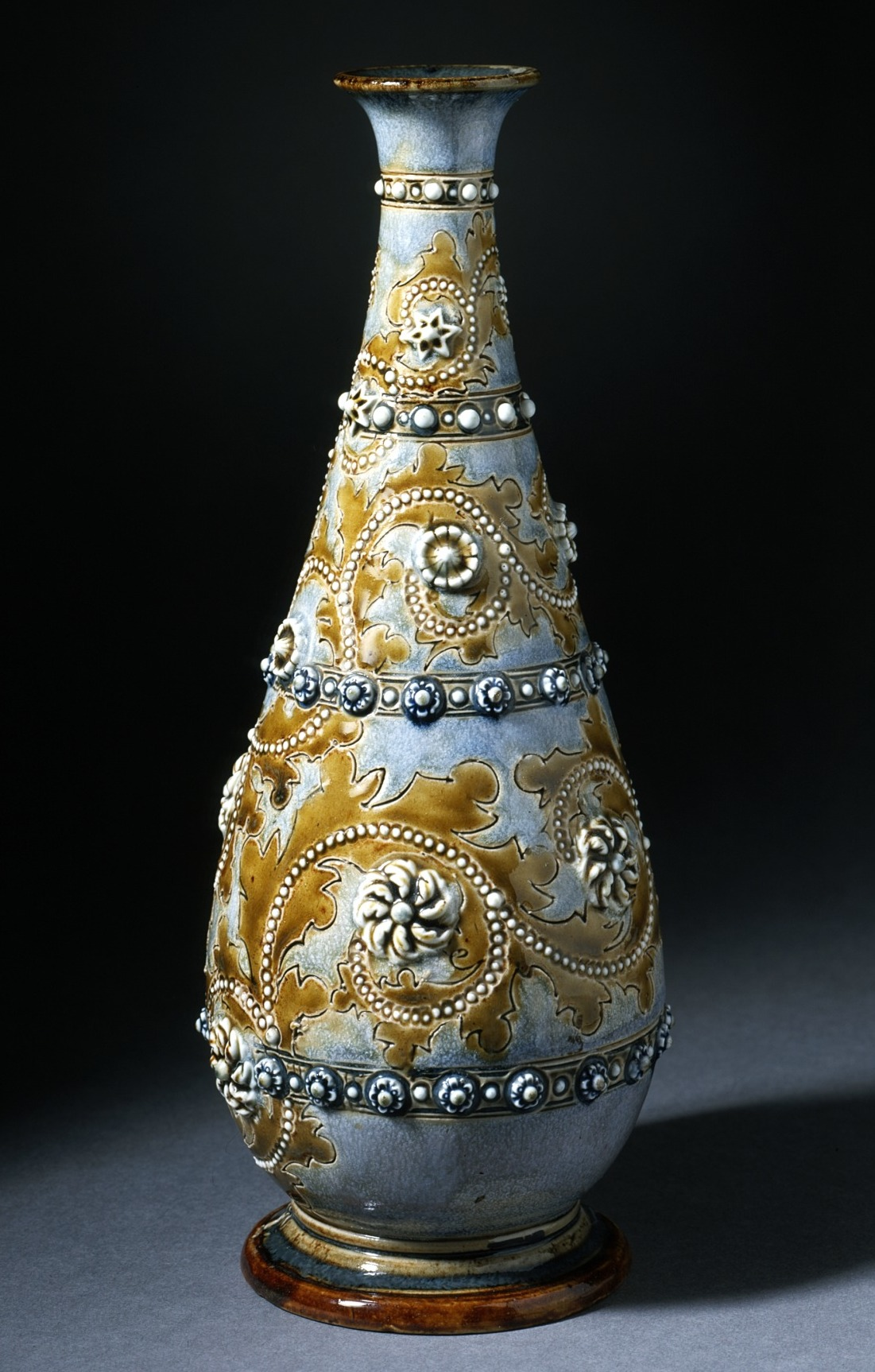
Lambeth salt-glazed stoneware by George Tinworth, 1876

By the 1860s Henry Doulton became interested in more artistic wares than the utilitarian ceramics which had grown the business. British stoneware had languished somewhat in artistic terms, although Wedgwood and others continued to produce jasperware and some other stonewares in a very refined style, competing with porcelain. The Doulton wares went further back to earlier salt-glazed styles, with a varied glaze finish. This "gave stoneware an entirely new impetus, realizing the potential of the material".

As the company became interested in diversifying from its utilitarian wares into more decorative objects, it developed a number of earthenware and stoneware bodies. The so-called "Lambeth faience" (from 1872) was "a somewhat heavily potted creamware much used in decorative plaques and vases", often with underglaze painting. Other bodies were called "Impasto" (1879); "Silicon" (1880), "a vitrified unglazed stoneware decorated with coloured clays"; "Carrara" (1887), white earthenware, also used as architectural terracotta; "Marquetrie" (1887), "marbled clays in checker work", then glazed; "Chine" impressed with fabrics to texture the clay, these burnt away in the kiln.

By 1871, Henry Doulton, John's son, launched a studio at the Lambeth pottery, and offered work to designers and artists from the nearby Lambeth School of Art. The first to be engaged was George Tinworth followed by artists such as the Barlow family (Florence, Hannah, and Arthur), Frank Butler, Mark Marshall, Eliza Simmance and John Eyre. John Bennett was in charge of the "Lambeth faience" department until he emigrated to America in 1876, where he had success with his own pottery.

Doulton was rather unusual in that most of the Lambeth studio pieces were signed by the artist or artists, usually with initials or a monogram incised on the base. Many are also dated. Until 1882, "every piece of the company's art stoneware was a unique item" but after that some pieces were made in batches, as demand grew.

There were initial production difficulties in producing the "art" pieces; at first they were fired in the open kiln with other wares, but later saggars were used. They were not especially profitable, sometimes not profitable at all, but there were huge profits in other parts of the business. Like other manufacturers, Doulton took great trouble with the wares submitted to international exhibitions, where they were often medal winners. The period 1870–1900 saw "the great years of Doulton's art stoneware", which remains popular with collectors.

In 1882, Doulton purchased the small factory of Pinder, Bourne & Co, at Nile Street in Burslem, Staffordshire, which placed Doulton in the region known as The Potteries.

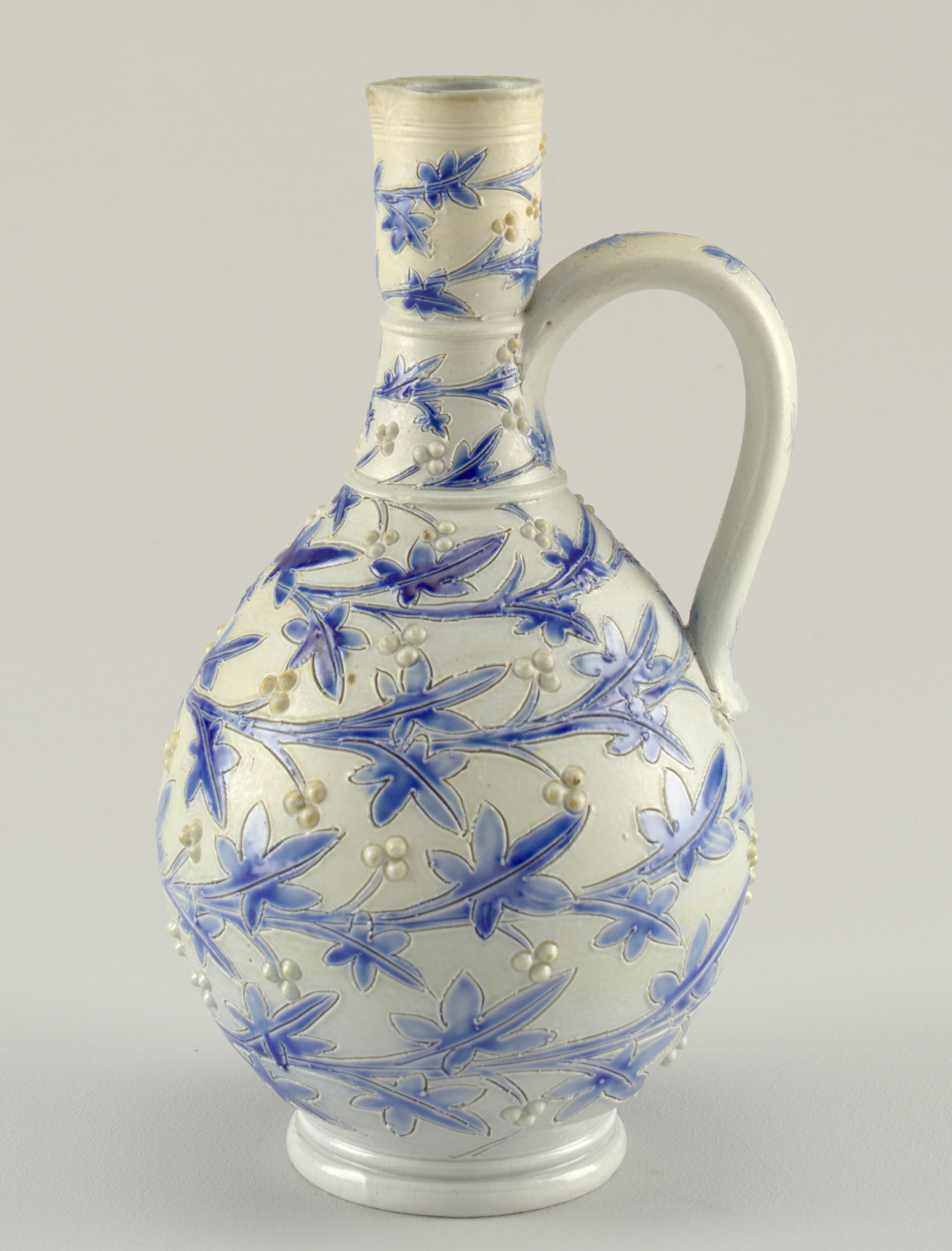
Vase, 1869–72, salt-glazed Lambeth stoneware with incised and relief decoration

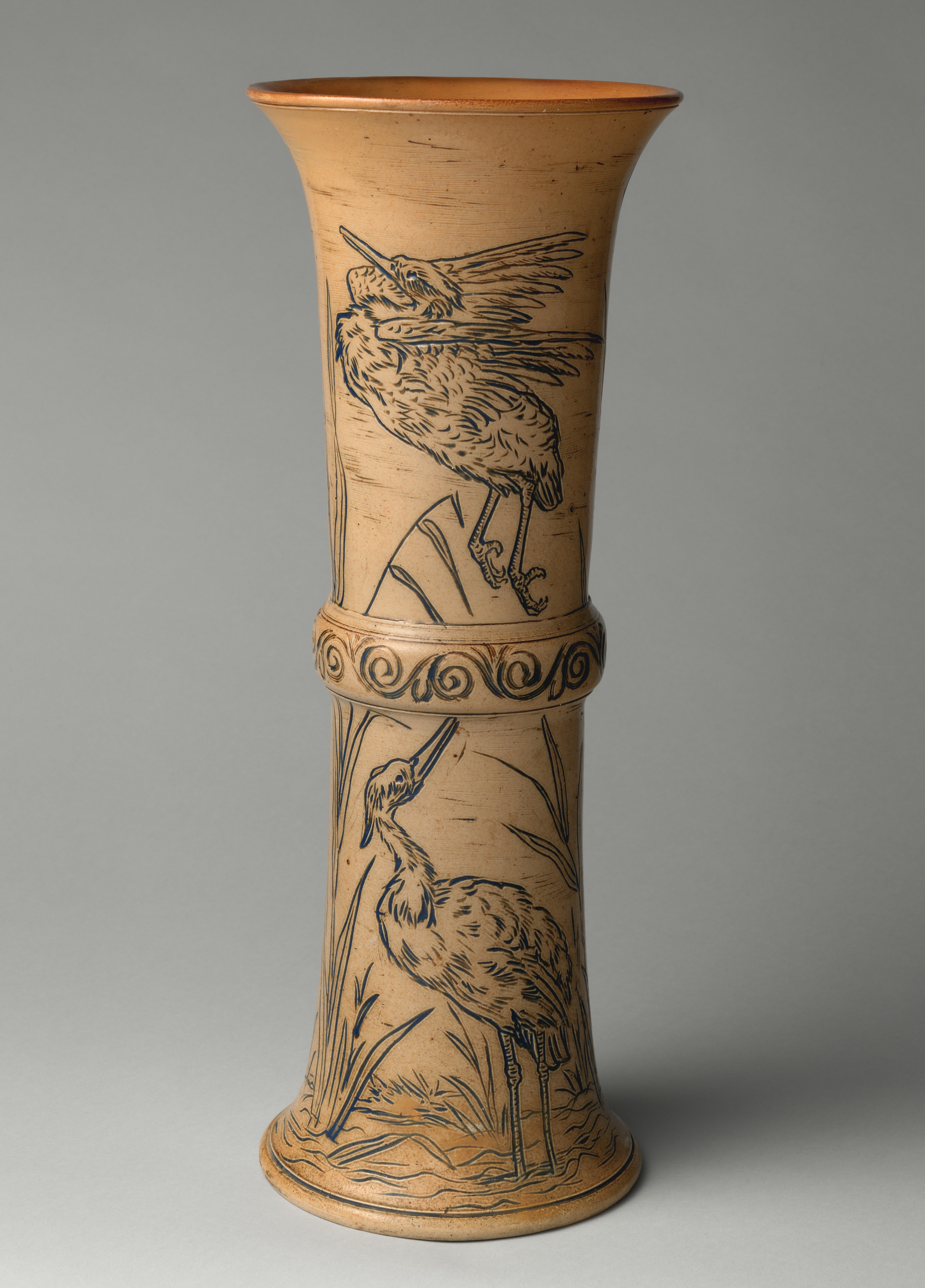
Incised Lambeth stoneware by Hannah Barlow, 1874

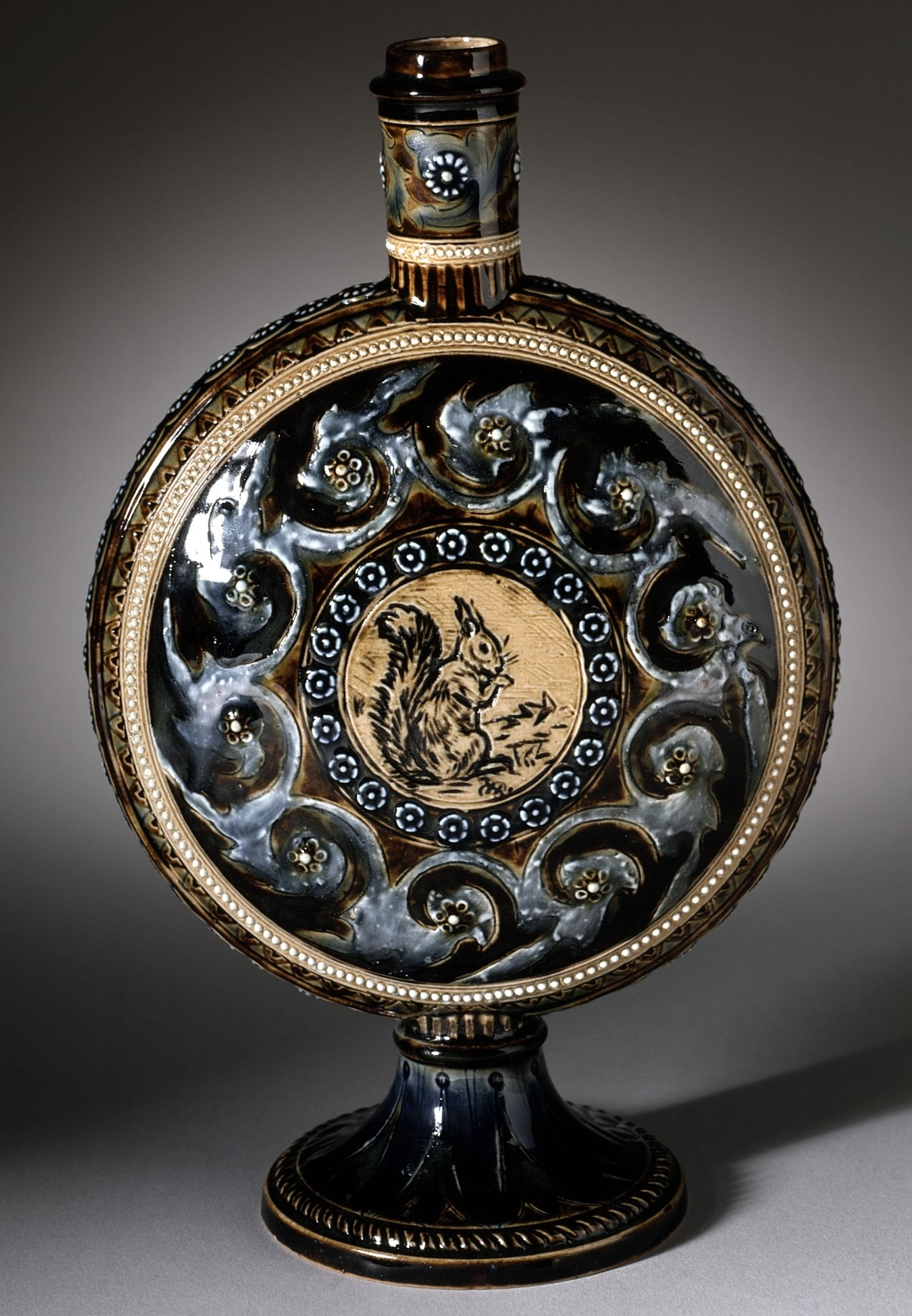
Flask with Squirrels, 1875, salt-glazed stoneware, Hannah Barlow, Lambeth

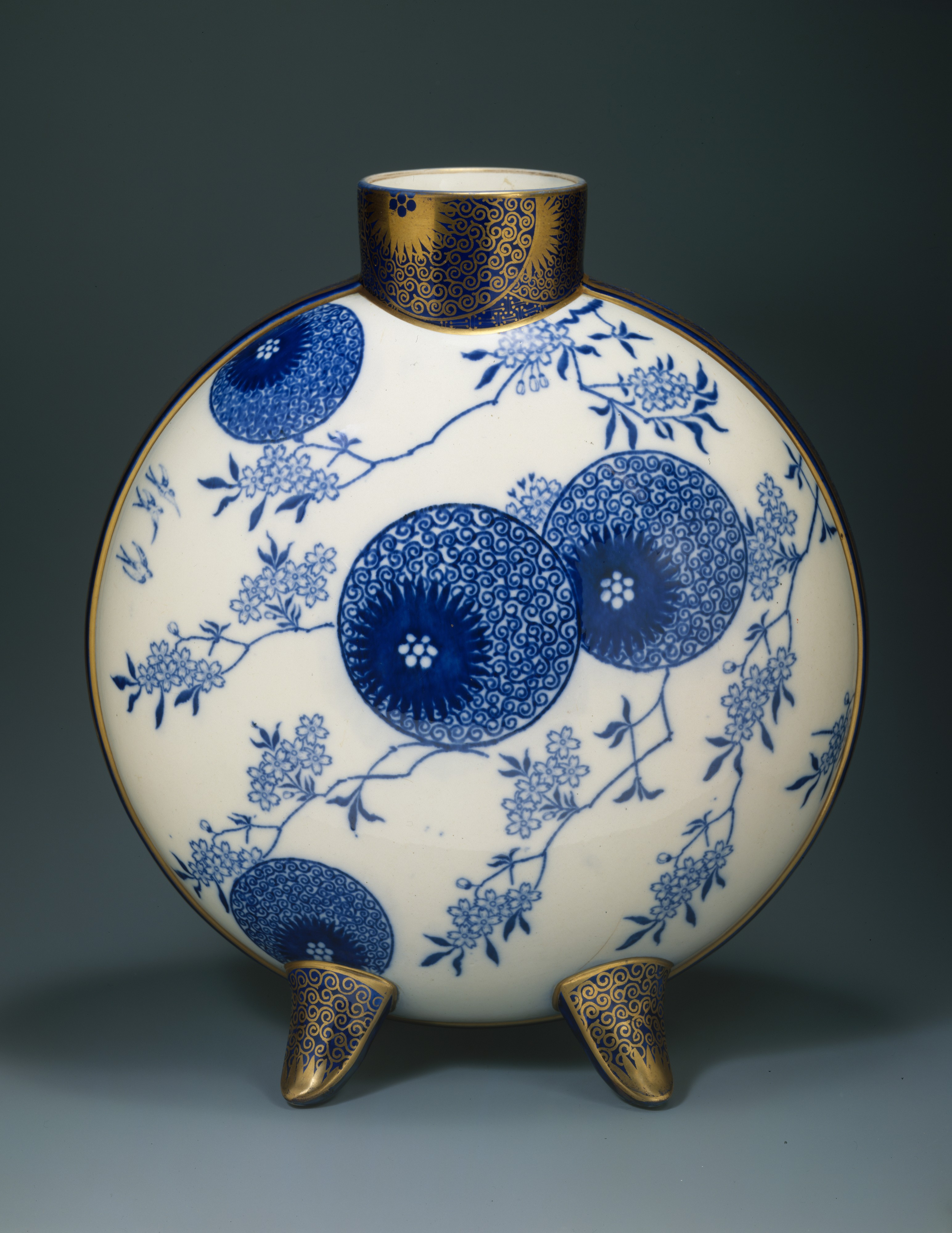
Moon flask, c. 1878–82, lead-glazed earthenware, transfer-printed and gilt

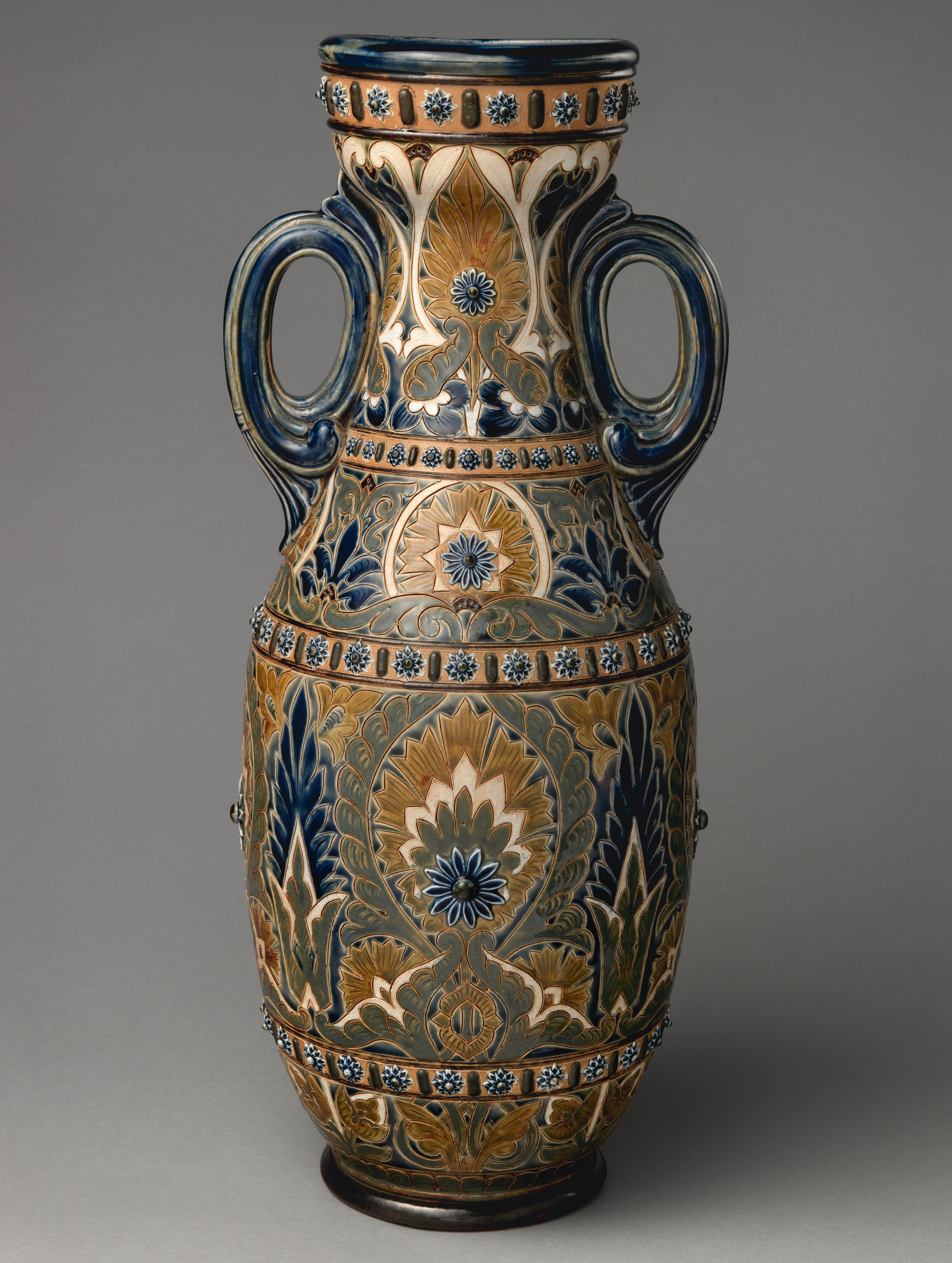
Lambeth stoneware vase, 1879, by Frank A. Butler

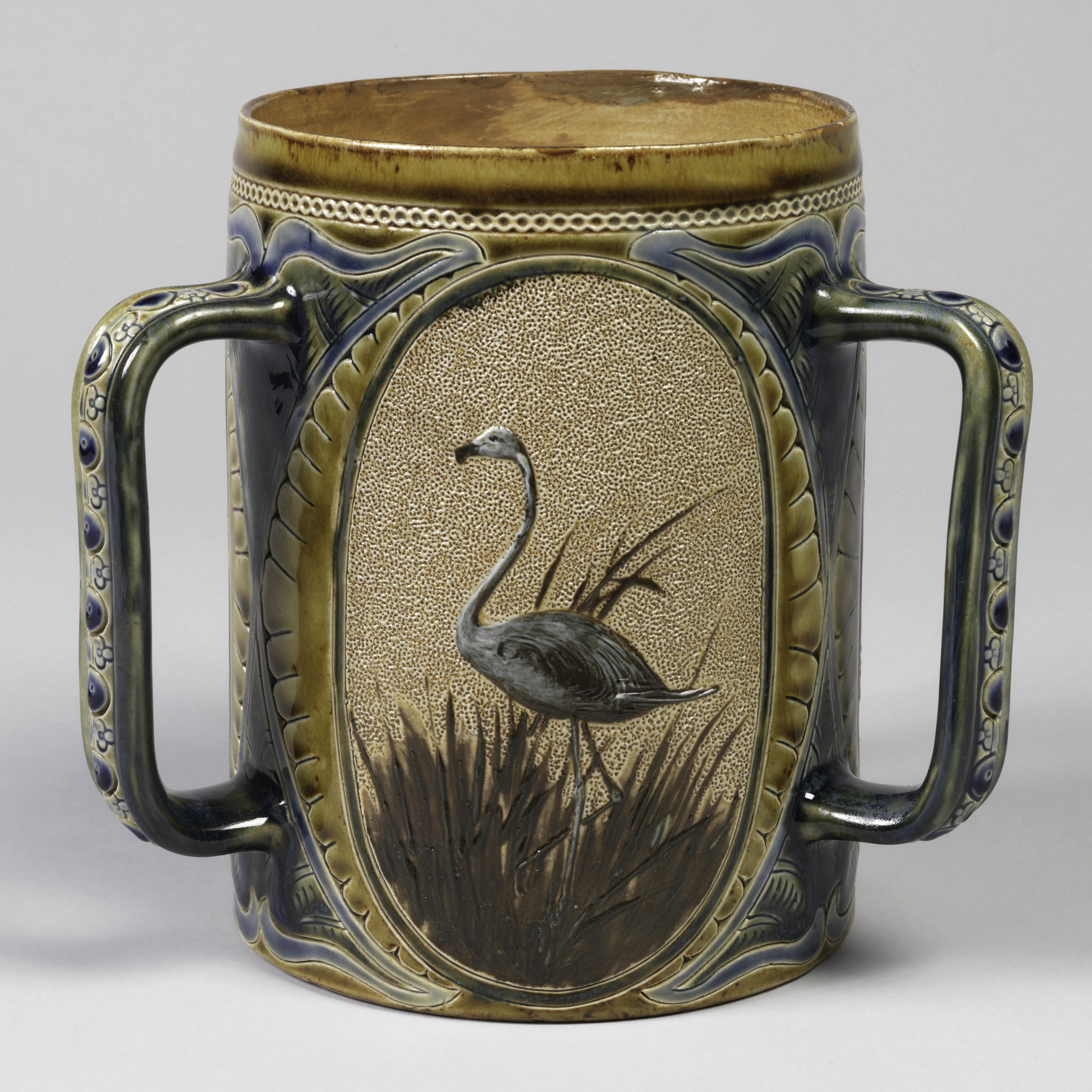
Three-handled tankard, Lambeth stoneware, 1884

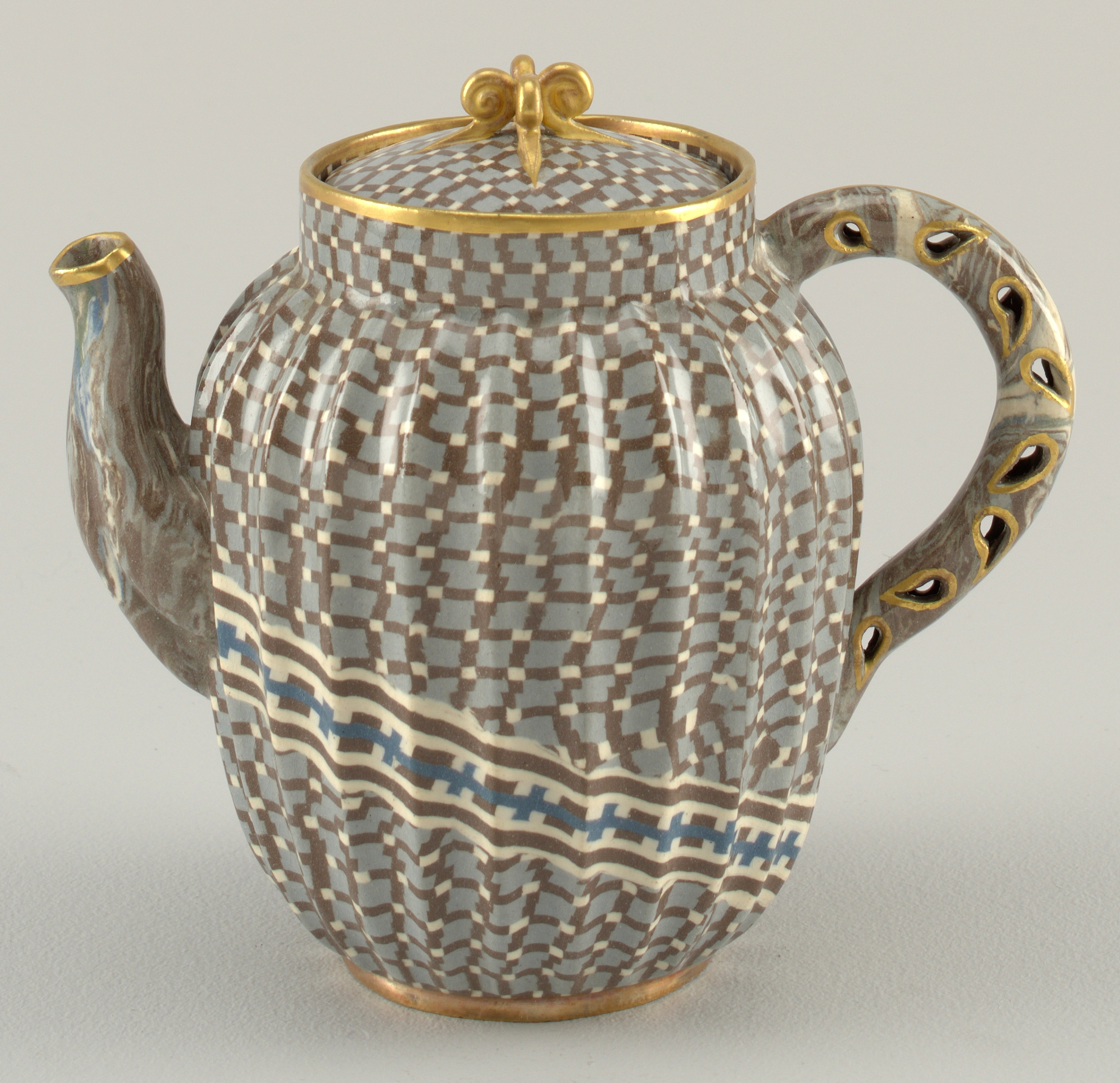
Teapot in Marquetrie ware, using different clays, stoneware, 1887–1900

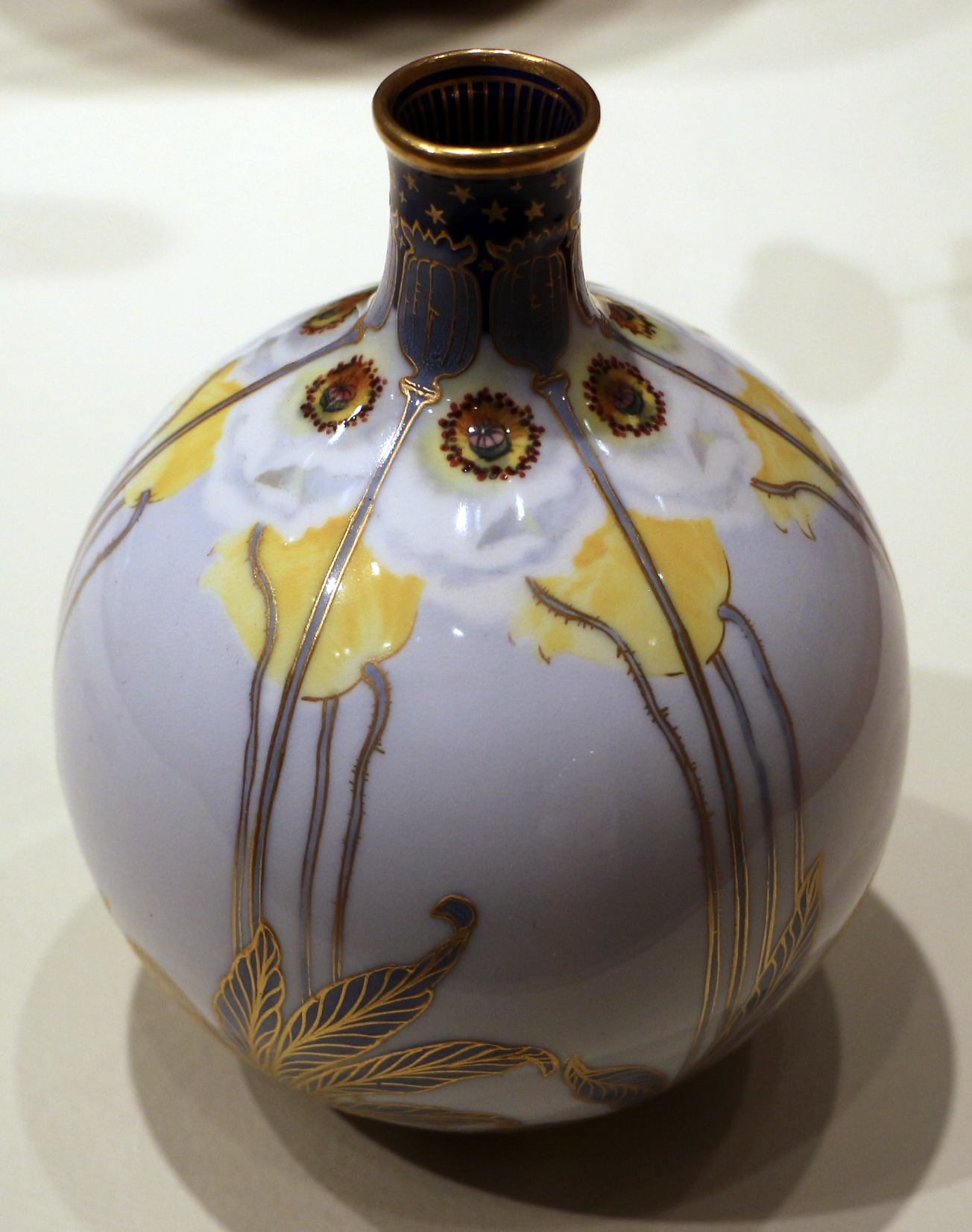
Bone china vase, Burslem, c. 1890s, by William Hodkinson

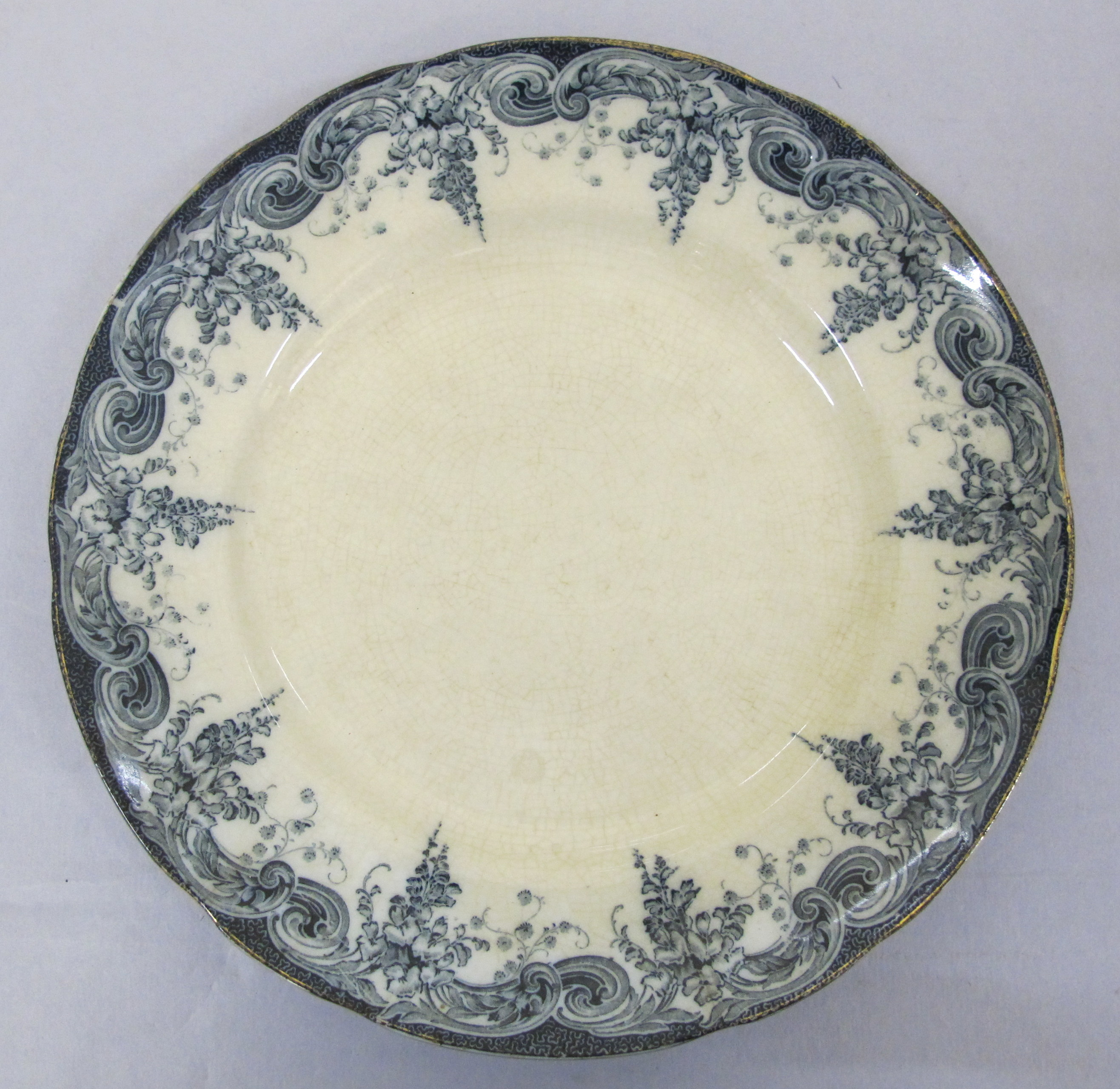
Laburnham pattern transfer-printed plate, typical of the middle-market bone china tableware made at Burslem

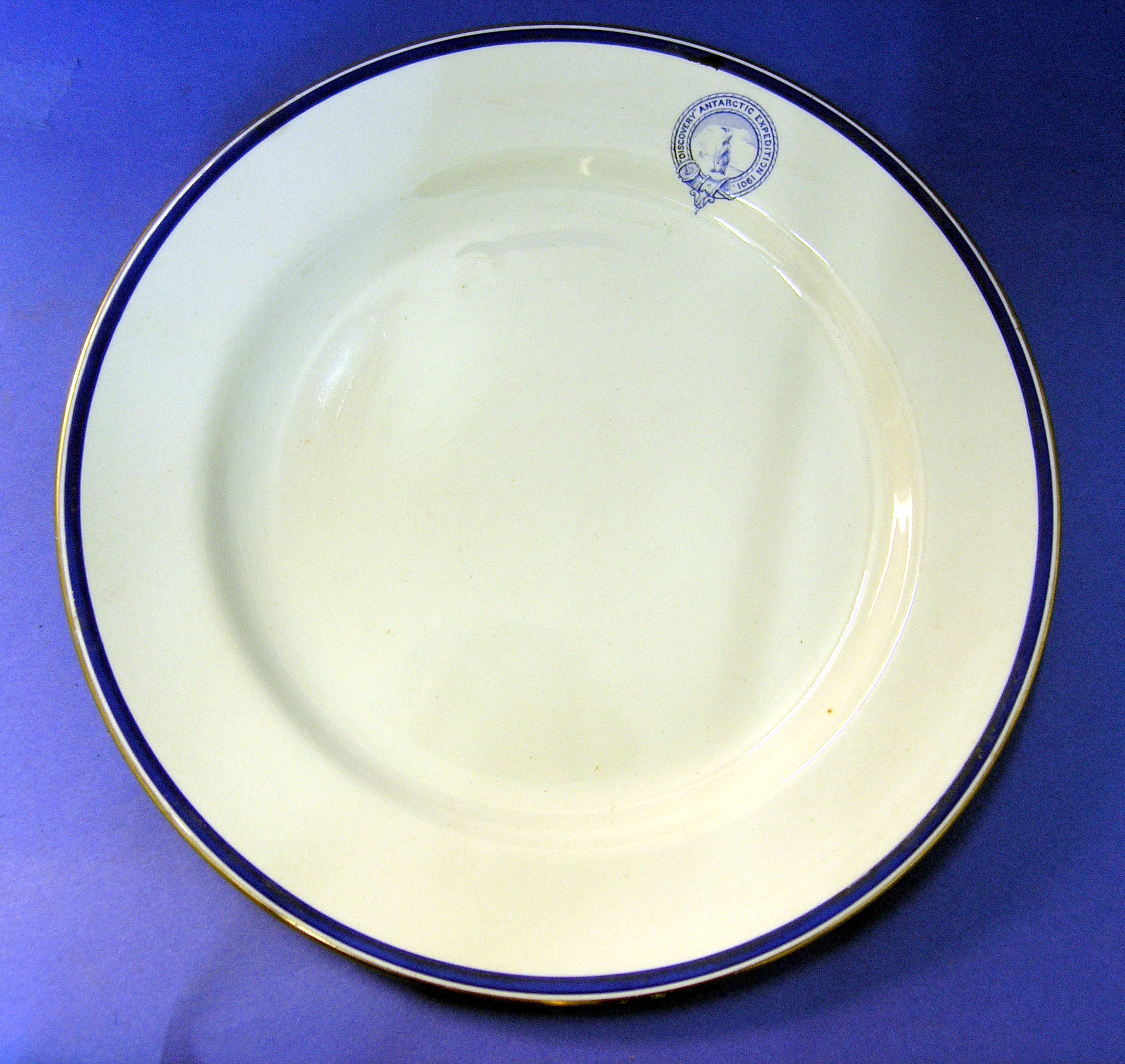
Burslem bone china plate from Captain Scott's first expedition, marked "DISCOVERY" ANTARCTIC EXPEDITION 1901 around a penguin

=== Architectural ceramics ===
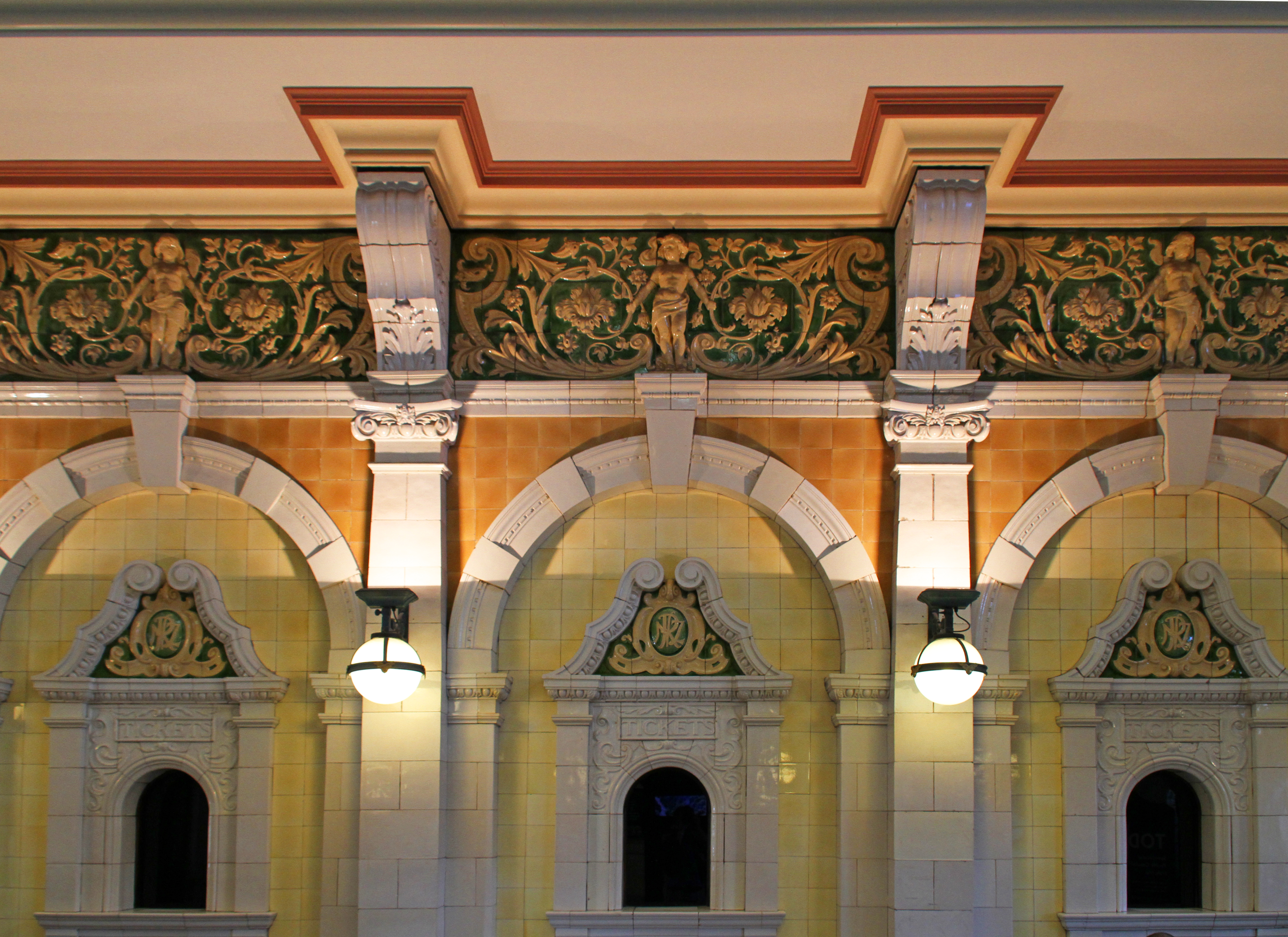
Frieze and walls in Dunedin Railway Station, New Zealand, 1906

Doulton also manufactured architectural terracotta (usually stoneware), mainly at Lambeth, and produced commissions for monumental sculpture in terracotta. Their late Victorian catalogues contained a wide range of architectural elements with, for example, tall Tudor-style chimney pots in many different designs. The Tudor originals of these were built up in shaped brick, but Doultons supplied them in a single piece. There were ranges of small Gothic arches, columns and capitals.

When the Anglican St. Alban's Church was built in Copenhagen, Denmark, in 1887 with Alexandra, Princess of Wales as one of the driving forces, Doulton donated and manufactured an altarpiece, a pulpit and a font. They were made with terracotta and included glazed details to the design of Tinworth.

The Hotel Russell in Russell Square (1900) has a large facade in buff terracotta, including life-size statues of "British queens" by Henry Charles Fehr, sculpted coats of arms and other large ornamental elements. This was somewhat old-fashioned for 1900, and the new taste for Art Nouveau favoured the glazed white "Carrara" material, which remained popular through to the Art Deco of the 1930s, often combined with bespoke decoration in bright colours, as at the Turkey Cafe in Leicester, also of 1900. William James Neatby was the Royal Doulton's chief designer from 1890 to 1901 and designed some of the finest Modern Style (British Art Nouveau style) architectural ceramics and sculptures. Everard's Printing Works is a leading surviving example of an exterior in Doulton's Carrara glazed architectural terra-cotta.

One of the largest schemes they made is the Doulton Fountain, now in Glasgow Green, given by Sir Henry Doulton for the International Exhibition of 1888. When the over life-size statue at the top was destroyed in a lightning strike in 1901, Doulton paid for a second hand-made statue to be produced. Sir Henry's mausoleum is another fine example of Doulton's exterior terracottas, as are the pedimental sculptures for the department store Harrods (1880s).

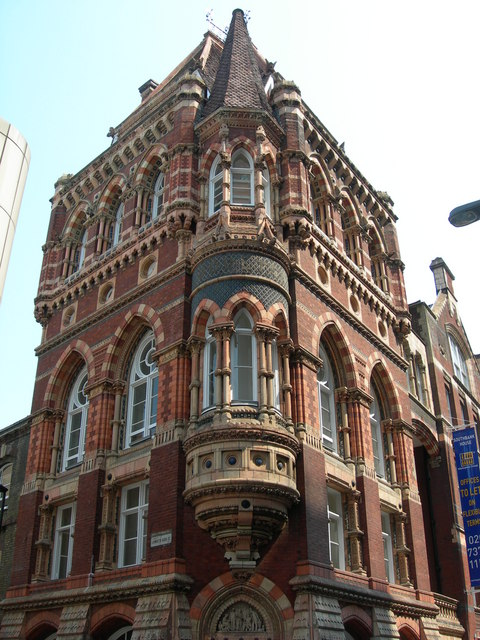
The surviving Southbank House of Doulton's former headquarters in Lambeth, showing off their architectural terracottas

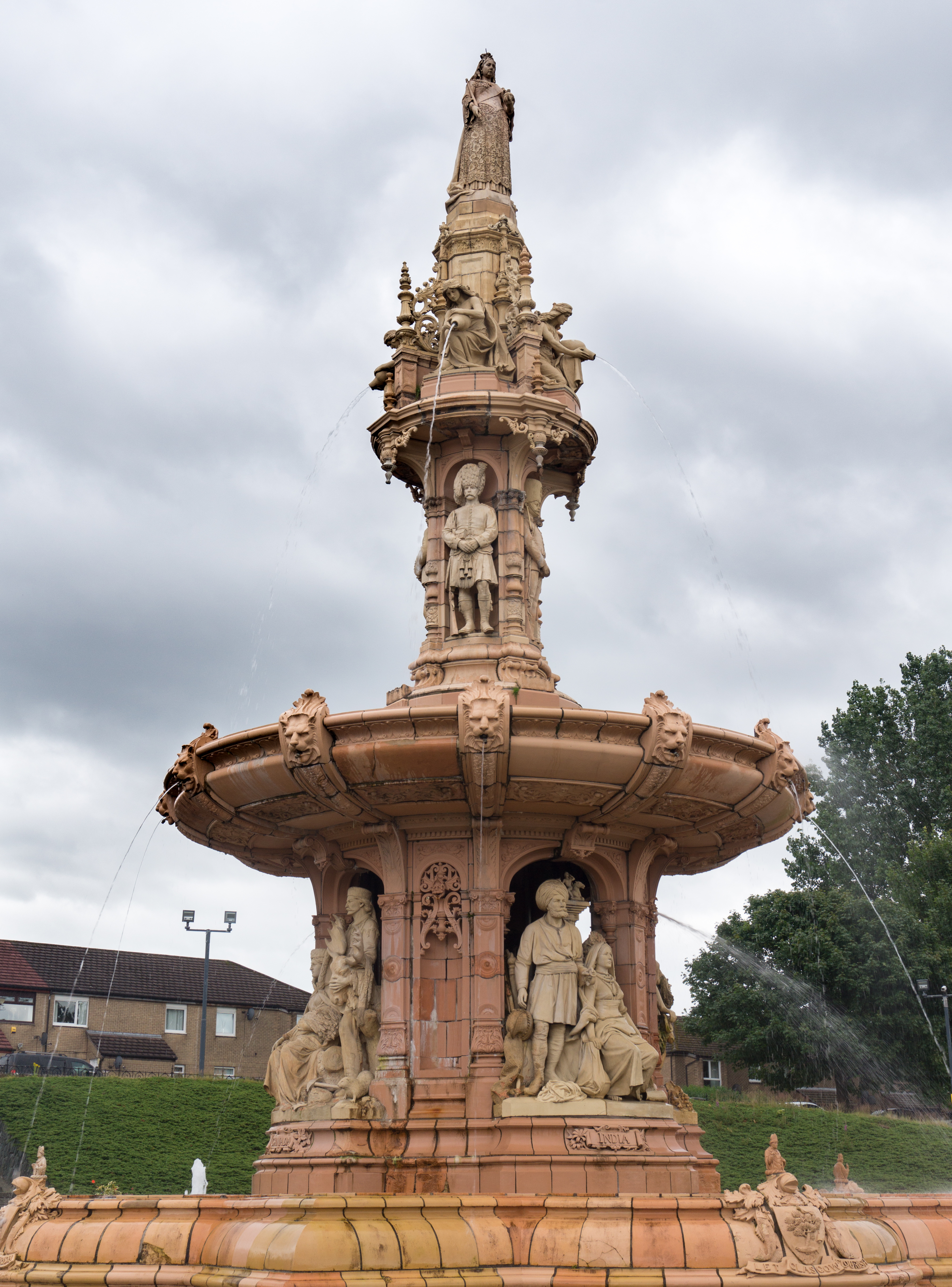
The Doulton Fountain, Glasgow Green, 1888

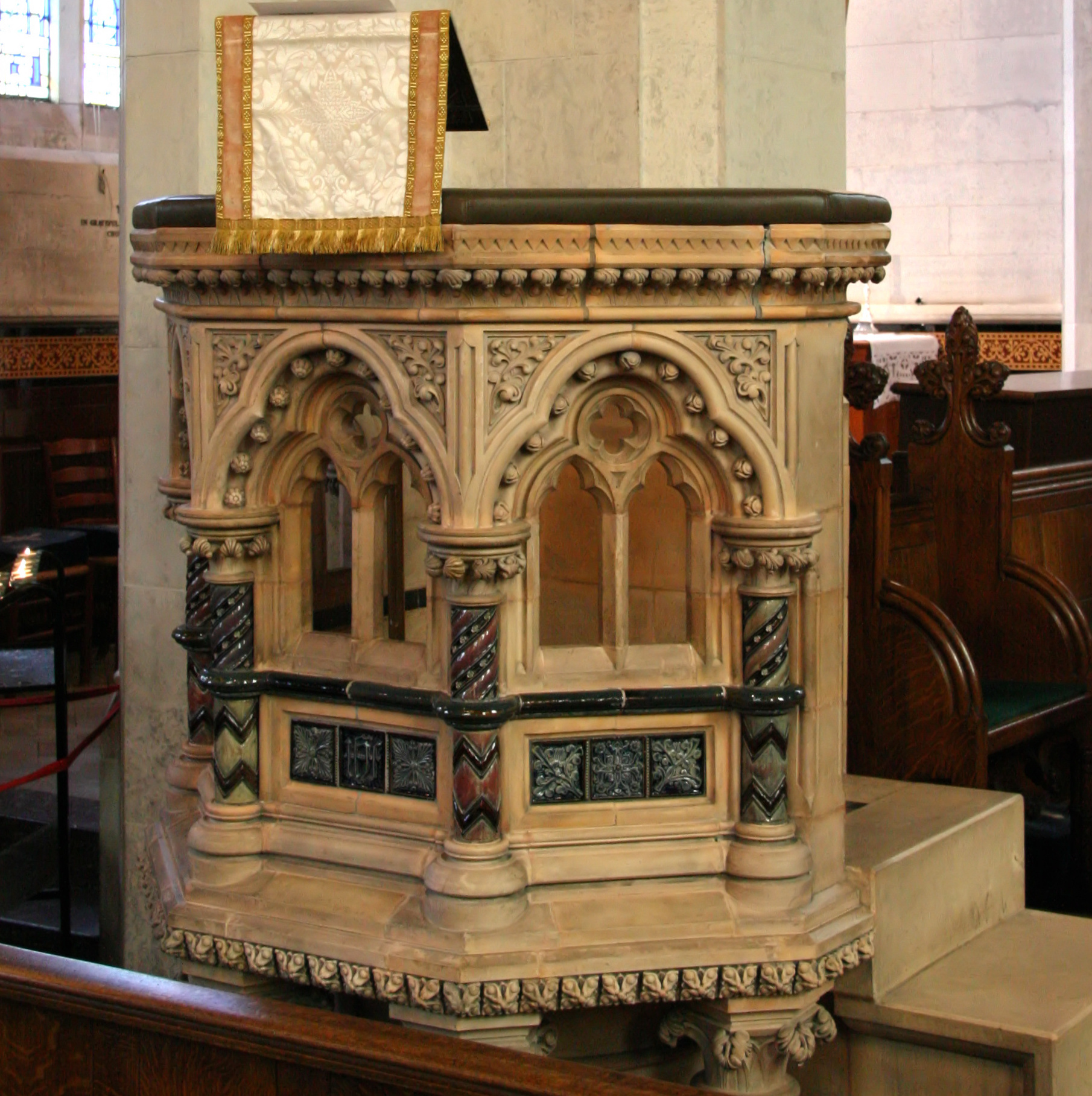
The pulpit in St. Alban's Anglican Church in Copenhagen, Denmark, donated and manufactured by Doulton

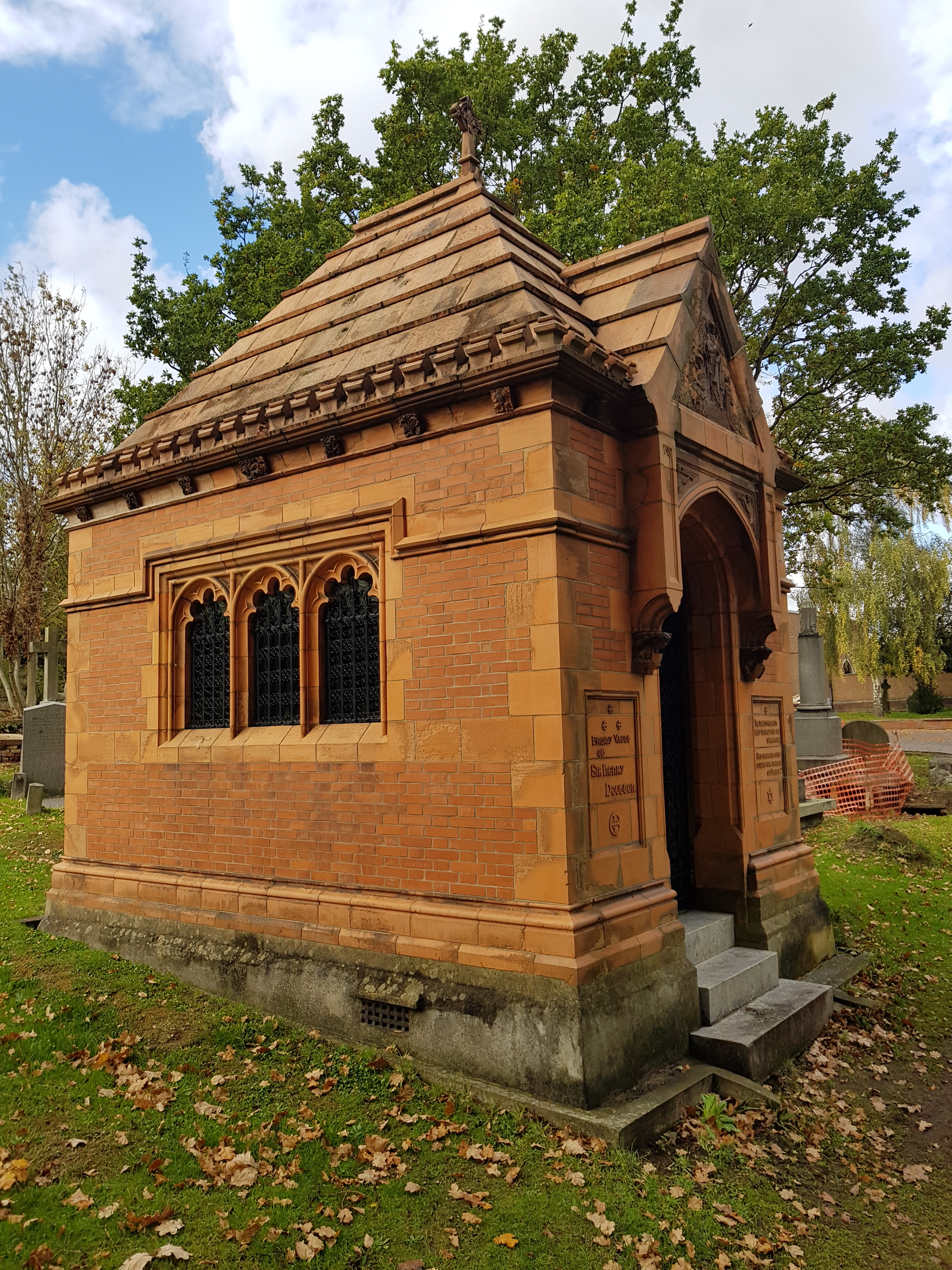
Sir Henry Doulton Mausoleum, West Norwood Cemetery, c. 1897

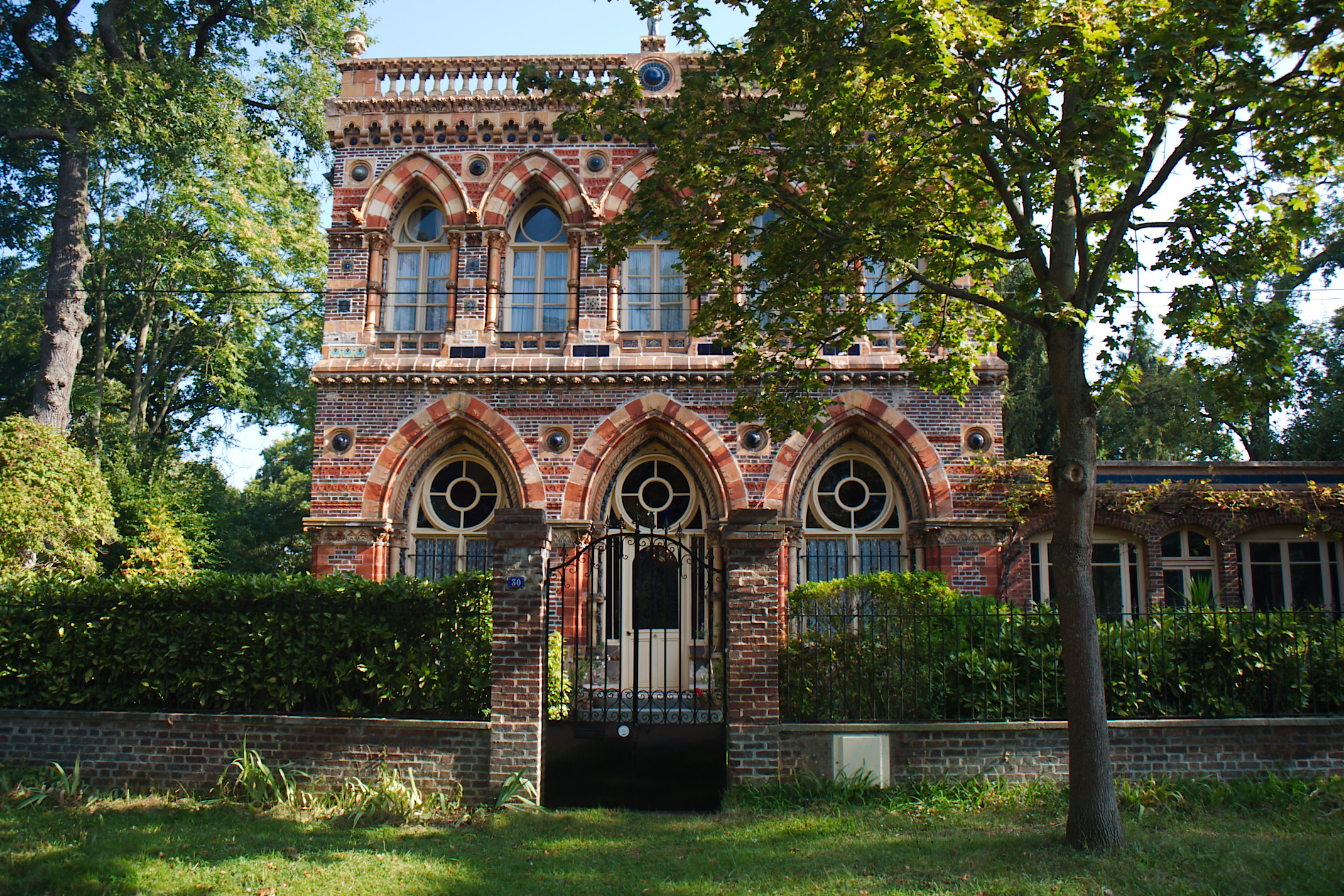
The "Maison Doulton" in Maisons-Laffitte near Paris, c. 1880

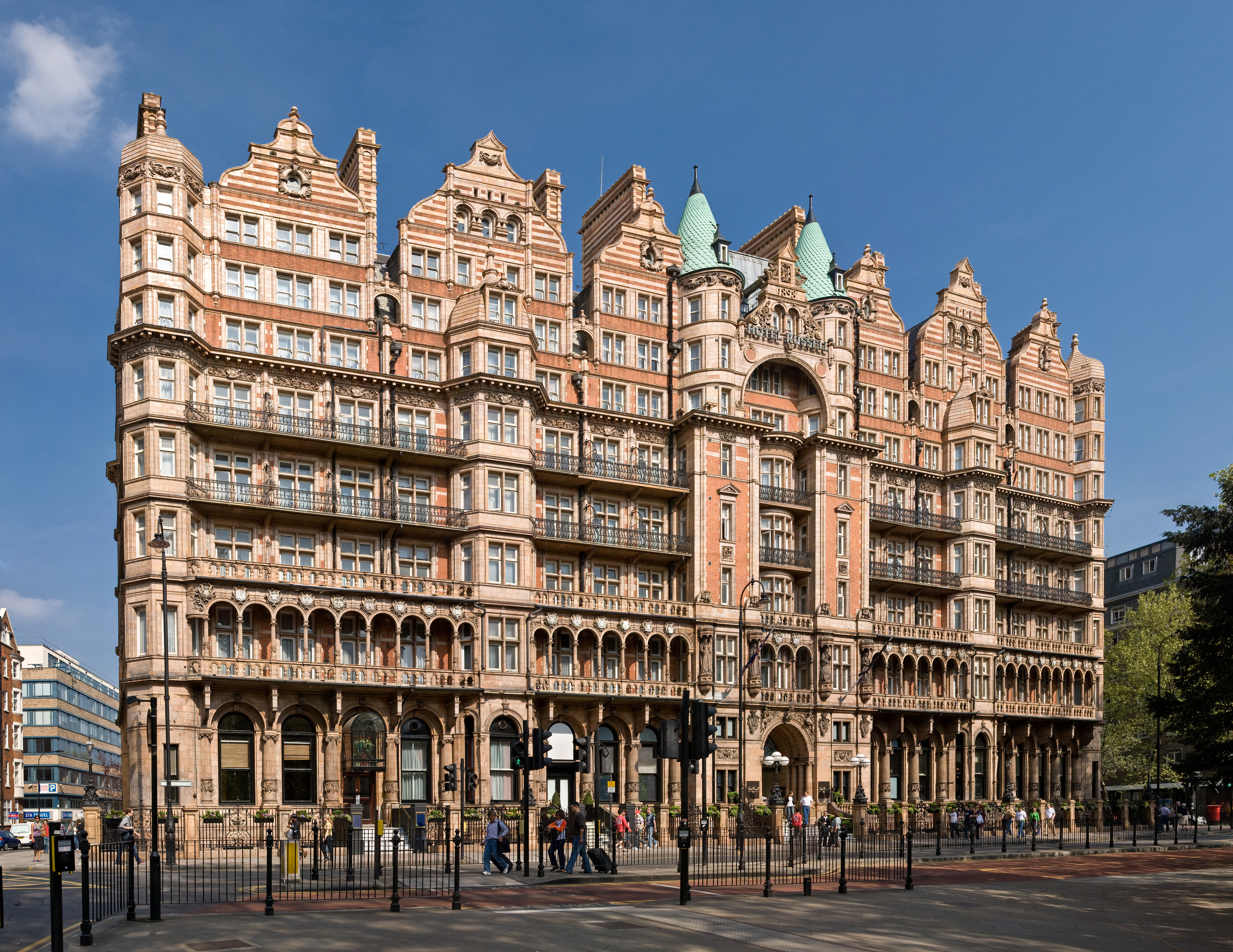
Hotel Russell on Russell Square, London, 1900

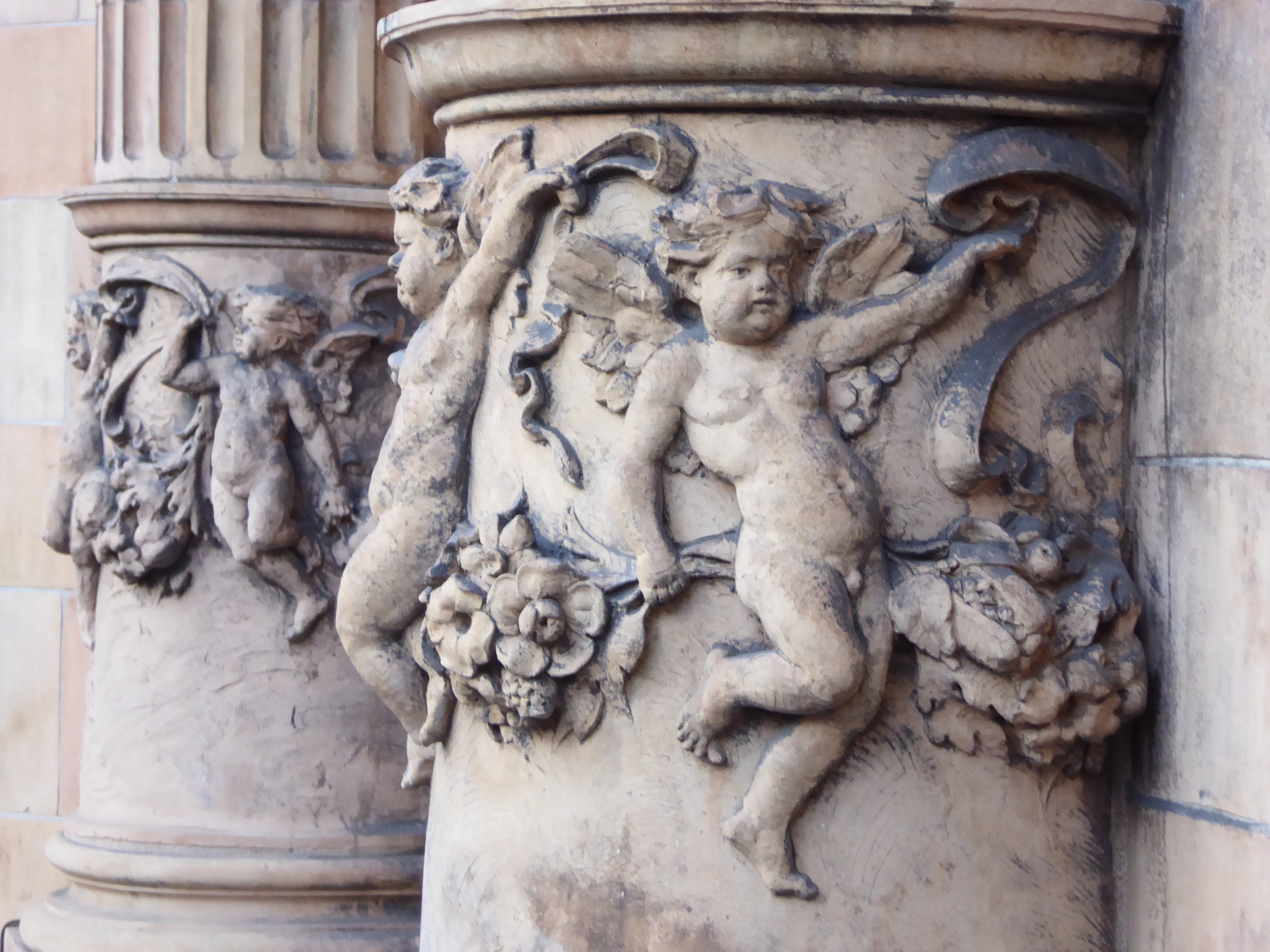
Putti on sculptural columns on the Hotel Russell facade

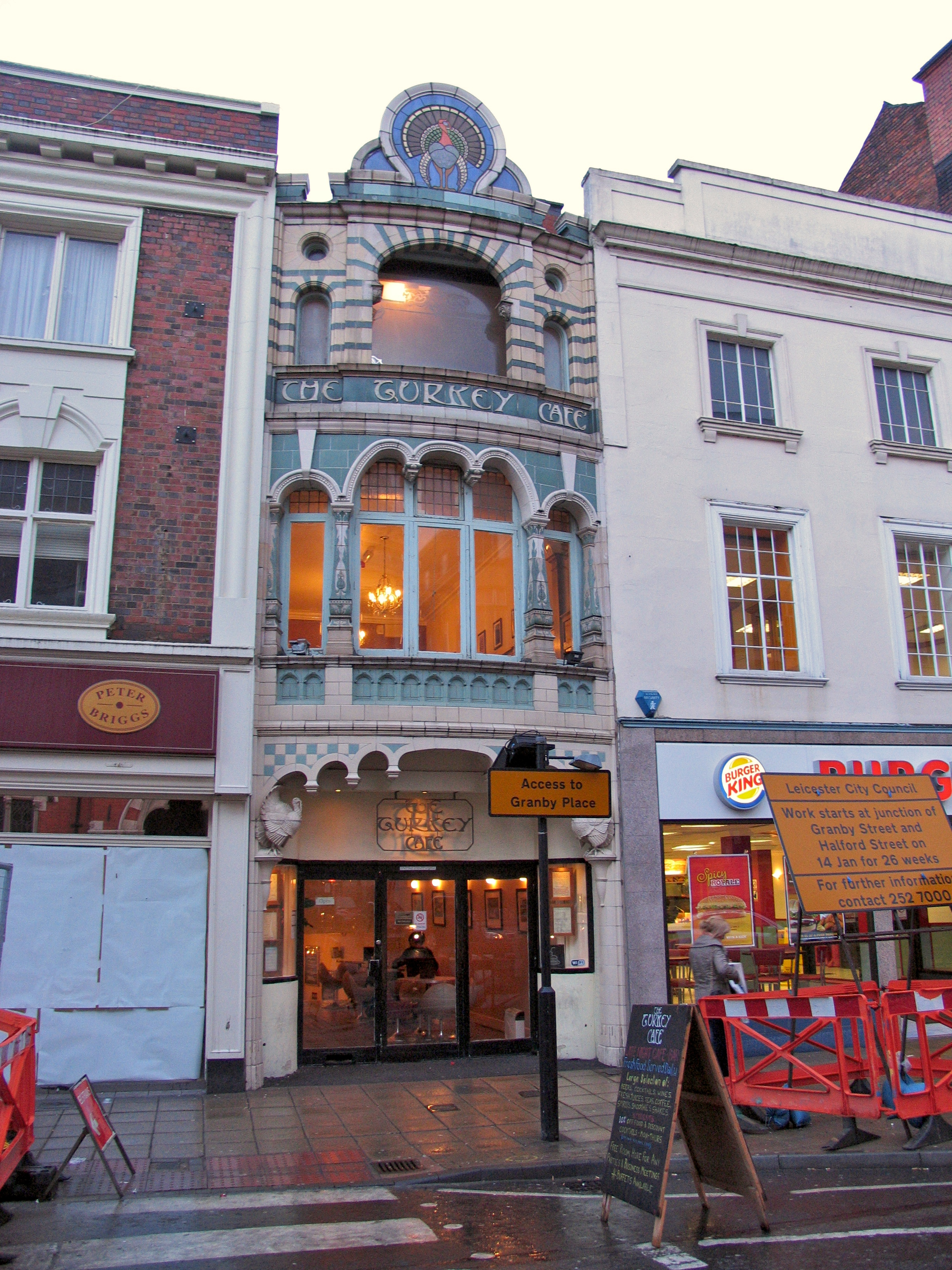
The Turkey Cafe in Leicester, 1900, Art Nouveau in "Carrara" white glazed architectural terracotta

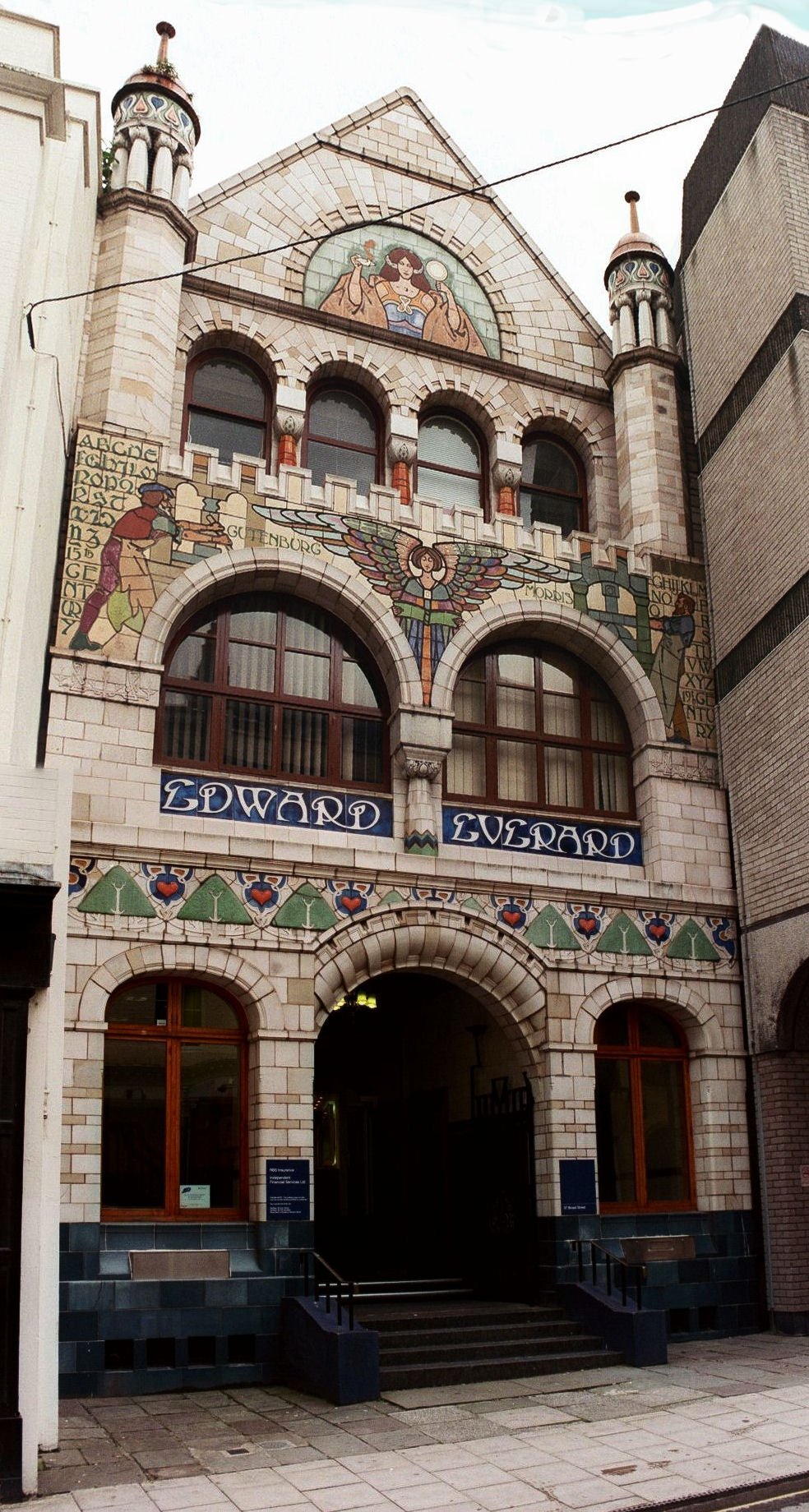
Edward Everard printworks, Bristol, 1901, with "Carrara" white glazed architectural terracotta

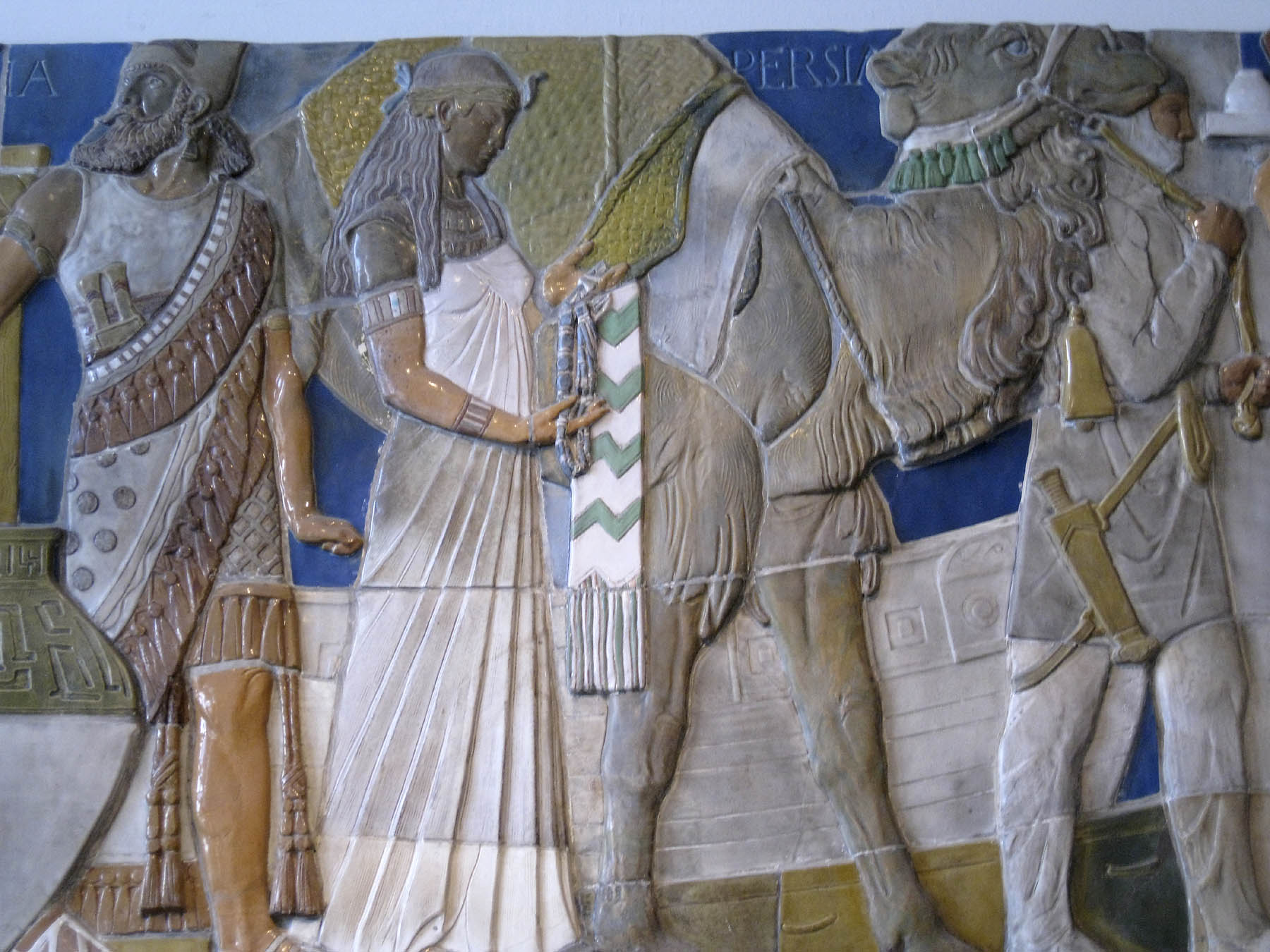
Detail of frieze Pottery through the Ages for the exterior of Doulton's Lambeth headquarters, 1939, now V&A Museum

By this time Doulton was popular for stoneware and ceramics, under the artistic direction of John Slater, who worked with figurines, vases, character jugs, and decorative pieces designed by the prolific Leslie Harradine. Lambeth continued to make studio pottery in small quantities per design, often in stoneware and typically ornamental forms like vases, while Burslem made larger quantities of more middle market bone china tablewares and figures. By 1904 over 1,200 people were employed at Burslem.

The retirement and death of Sir Henry Doulton, both in 1897, led to the company going public at the start of 1899.

== 20th century ==
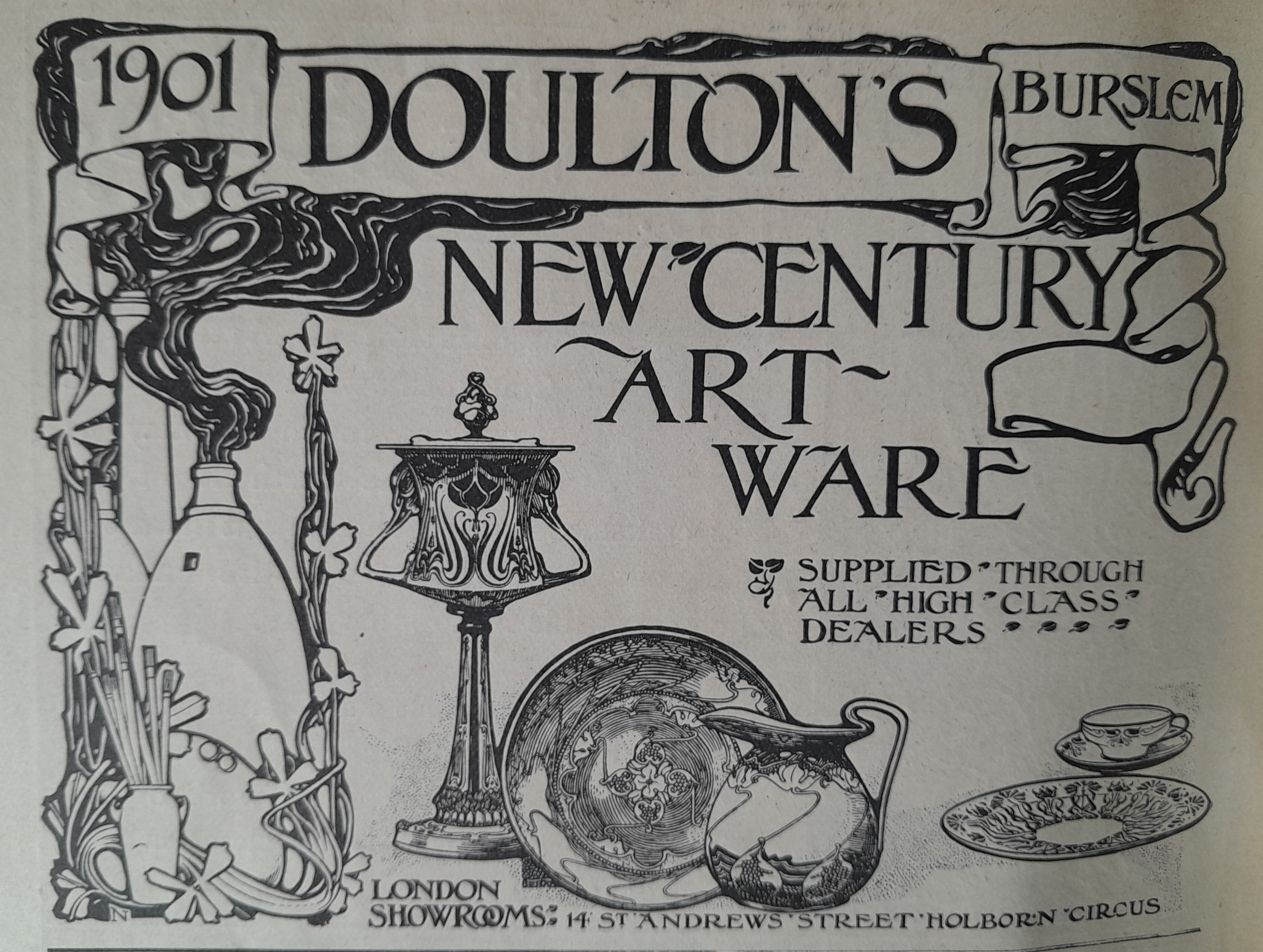
Advert for Doulton's New Century Art Ware, 1901

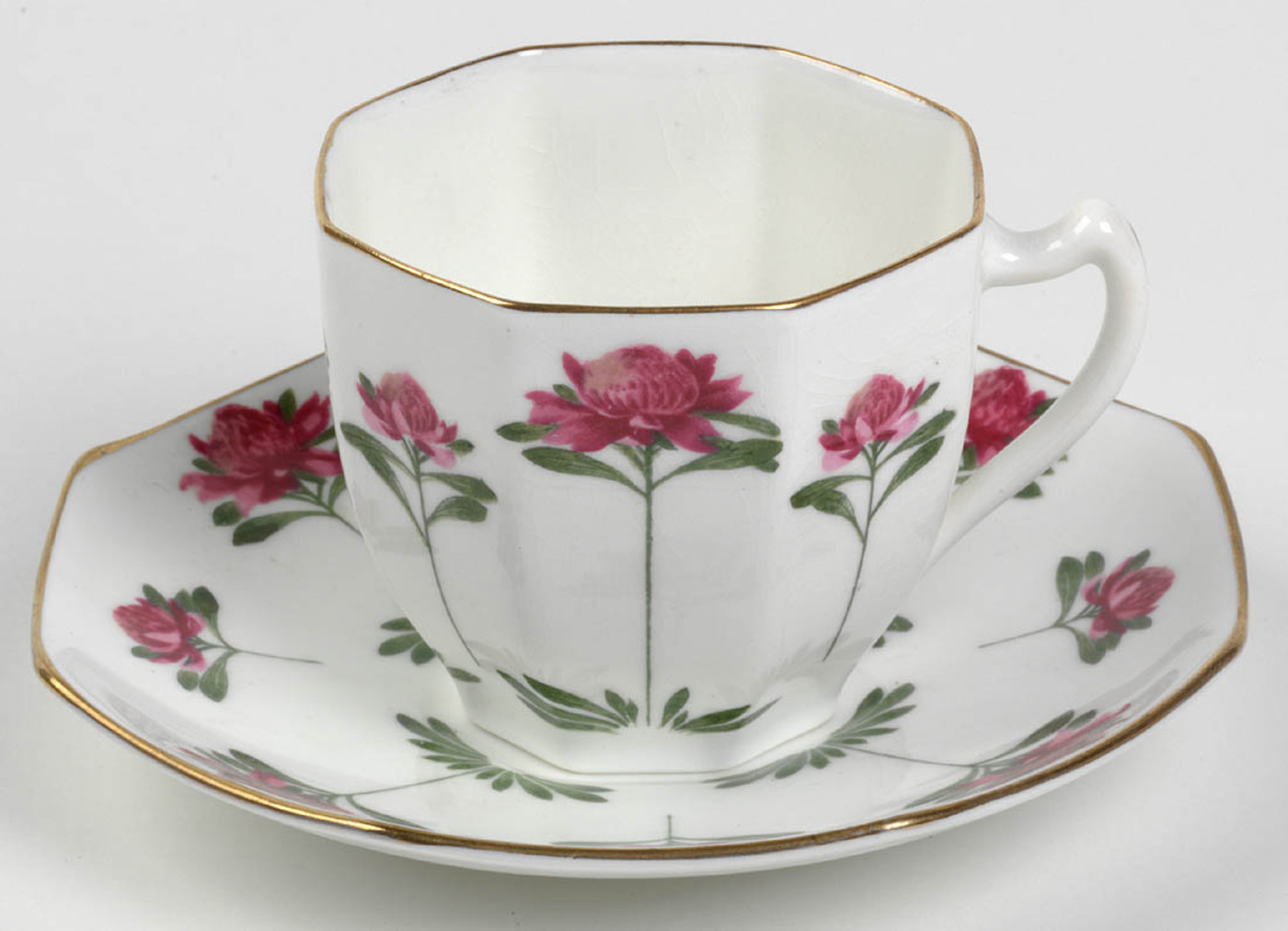
"Waratah" pattern, after 1922, a local flower to appeal to the Australian market

In 1901 King Edward VII awarded the Burslem factory the Royal Warrant, allowing that part of the business to adopt new markings and a new name, Royal Doulton. The bathroom ceramics and other utilitarian wares initially continued to be branded Doulton and Co. The company added products during the first half of the 20th century, and the tableware and decorative wares tended to shift from stonewares to high-quality bone china. Figurines in fashionable styles became increasingly important, for example a series of young girls in bathing costumes, in a mild version of Art Deco. Figures continued to be important throughout the 20th century, but the peak of quality in modelling and painting is generally thought to have been between the world wars.

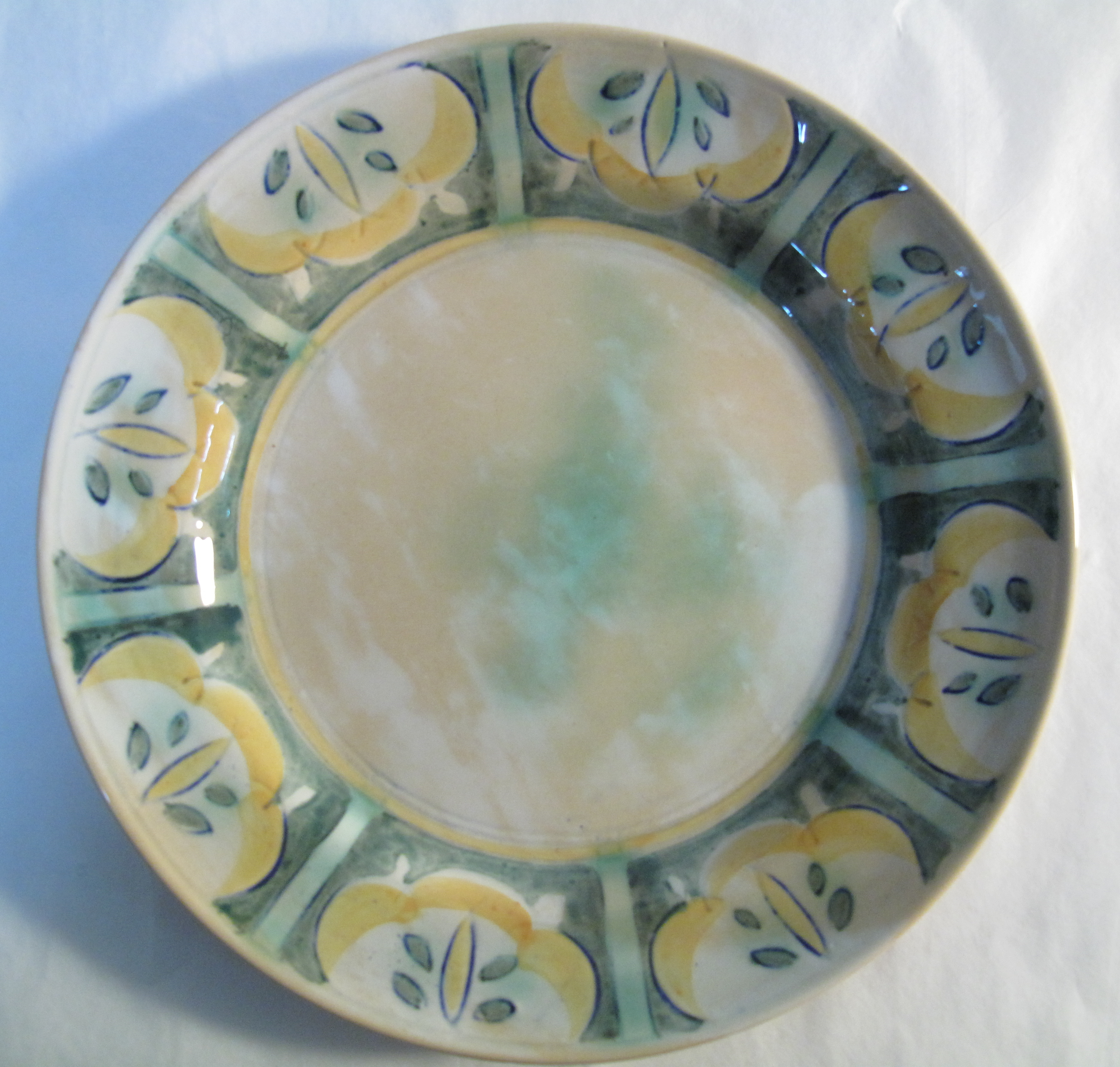
Dinner plate from service designed by Frank Brangwyn, after 1930

The well-known artist Frank Brangwyn designed a pattern for a dinner service in 1930, which continued to be made for some time. He created the design, but specified that the factory painters decorating the pieces be allowed some freedom in interpreting his designs.

In 1938, Doulton acquired the works of George Skey and Co. in Tamworth, Staffordshire, which had been producing drain pipes, chimney pots and chemical stoneware. Doulton modified the factory to produce a range of ceramics, including porcelain insulators, chemical porcelain, grinding media and for other applications. A high voltage laboratory for the testing of insulators was subsequently built.

The headquarters building and factory of Royal Doulton were in Lambeth in London, on the south bank of the Thames. This Art Deco building was designed by T P Bennett. In 1939 Gilbert Bayes created ceramic relief friezes that showed the history of pottery through the ages.

In 1963, a ceramic filter company Aerox Ltd., of Stroud, Gloucester, was acquired and subsequently integrated with the water filter division of Doulton Industrial Porcelains. Following various mergers and acquisitions over the years this company still exists, using the name Doulton., but is no longer connected to Royal Doulton.

In 1969 Doulton bought Beswick Pottery, long a specialist in figurines, mostly of animals, including some Beatrix Potter characters. Their factory in Longton, Stoke-on-Trent was used to make the popular "Bunnykins" range of anthropomorphic rabbits, originally produced in 1936 to designs by the then managing director's daughter, Sister Barbara Bailey, who was a nun.

The whole English pottery industry was losing ground in the post-war period, and Doulton's purchases of other companies was not enough to stem decline. The Lambeth factory closed in 1956 due to clean air regulations preventing urban production of salt glaze. Following closure, work was transferred to The Potteries. The company's headquarters building in Lambeth was demolished in 1978 and the friezes transferred to the Victoria & Albert Museum, after the intervention of Paul Atterbury amongst others. The office building in Black Prince Road is now known as Southbank House, complete with a frieze of potters and Sir Henry Doulton over the original main entrance, that was created by Tinworth.

In 1980 Pearson purchased Fairey Holdings, which historically had been well known for its aircraft. In the next few years some parts of Doulton were spun off, including the glass and sanitaryware divisions, Doulton Engineering (brought under the management of Fairey, with the insulator division merged with Allied Insulators in 1985).

The Churchbank factory was closed in 2000. The Beswick factory in Longton closed and the Doulton factory in Baddeley Green closed in 2003. The Nile Street factory in Burslem closed on 30 September 2005, and was demolished in 2014.

=== Corporate ===
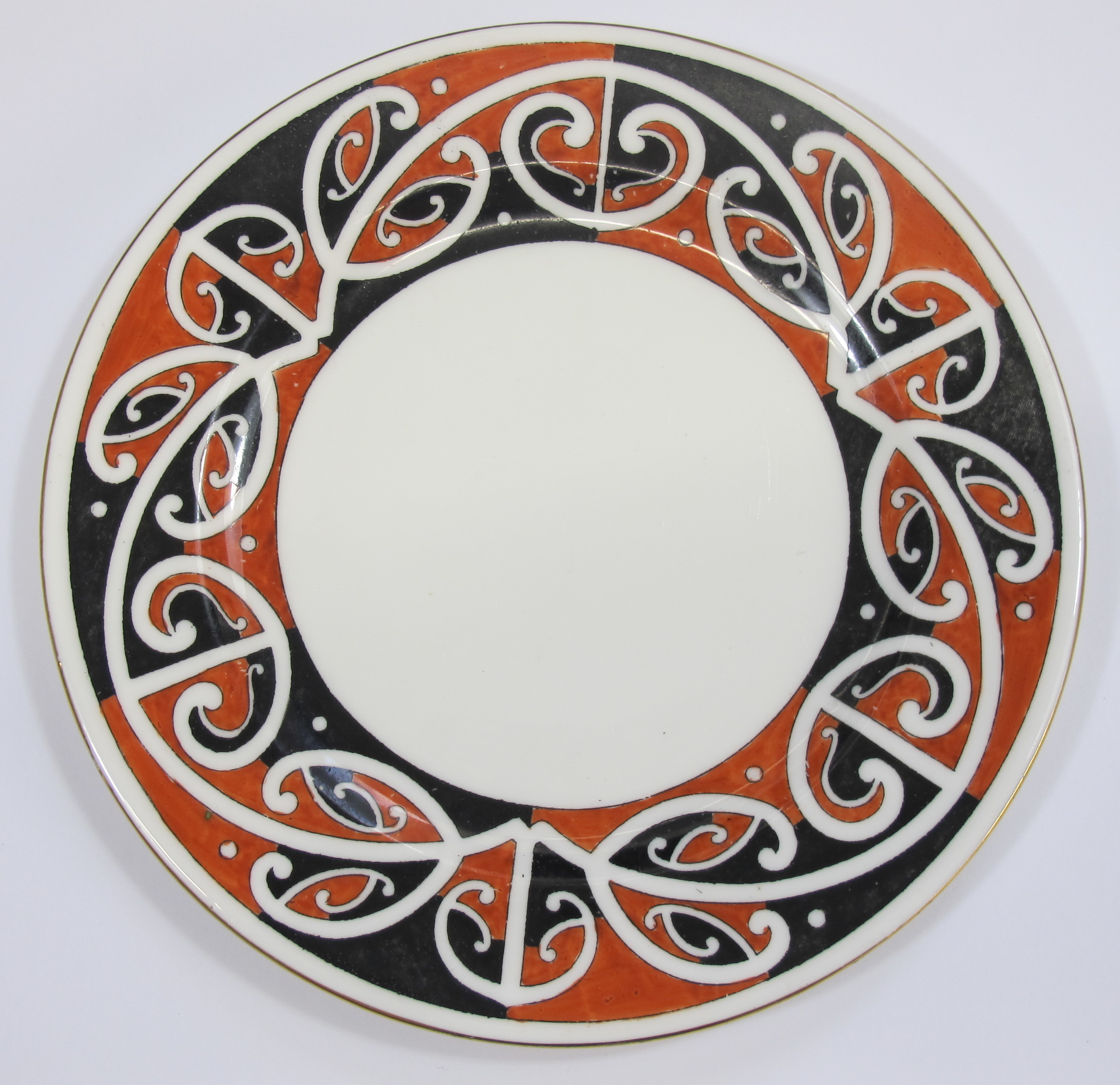
Plate in the "Maori Art" pattern, Burslem

In 1971, S. Pearson & Son acquired Doulton & Co. Pearson & Son owned Allied English Potteries and merged operations into Doulton & Co. All brands from Allied English Potteries and Doulton & Co. Ltd. including Royal Doulton, Minton, Beswick, Dunn Bennett, Booths, Colclough, Royal Albert, Royal Crown Derby, Paragon, Ridgway, Queen Anne, Royal Adderley and Royal Adderley Floral were moved under the umbrella of Royal Doulton Tableware Ltd. Royal Doulton Tableware Ltd was a subsidiary of Doulton & Co. Ltd, itself a subsidiary of the Pearson Group Doulton & Co. became Royal Doulton plc in 1993. Pearson spun off Royal Doulton in 1993. Waterford Wedgwood completed a takeover of Royal Doulton in 2005, acquiring all assets and brands.

Parts of the business were progressively sold off. The sanitaryware division was bought by Stelrad. In 1983 David Edward Dunn Johnson bought the hotelware division of Royal Doulton, now renamed Steelite and, as of 2025, was still operating in Stoke-on-Trent.

In 1995 Royal Doulton commissioned a new factory just outside Jakarta, Indonesia; this division is called PT Doulton. By 2009 the factory employed 1,500 people producing bone china under both Wedgwood and Royal Doulton brands. Annual production was reported to be between 5 and 7 million pieces. In order to reduce costs the majority of production of both brands has been transferred to Indonesia, with only a small number of high-end products continuing to be made in the UK.

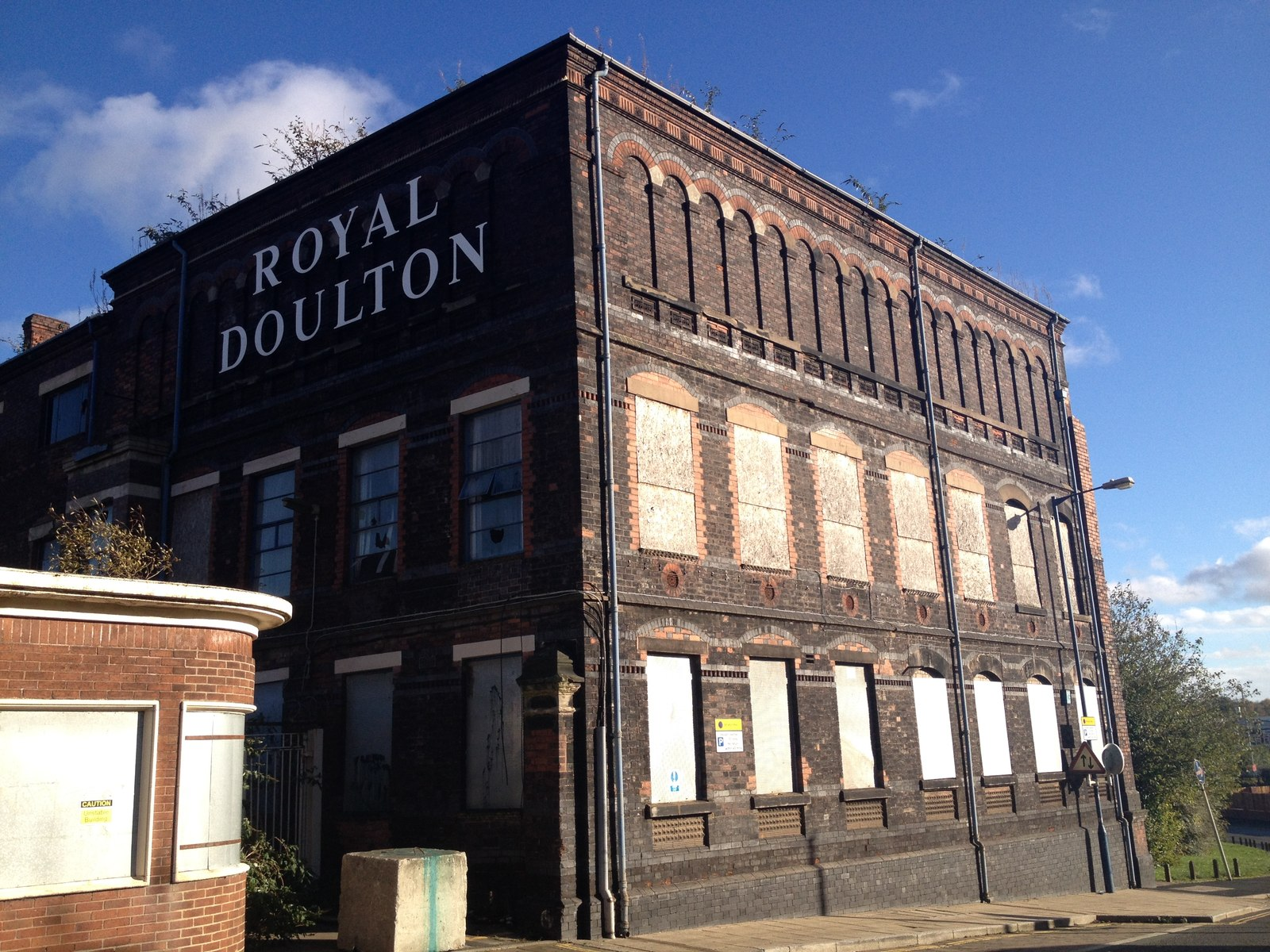
Derelict Royal Doulton factory on Nile Street, Burslem, UK

Royal Doulton Ltd., along with other Waterford Wedgwood companies, went into administration on 5 January 2009. Royal Doulton is now part of WWRD Holdings Limited. Its US business filed for Chapter 7 bankruptcy liquidation in April 2009. On 11 May 2015, Fiskars, a Finnish maker of home products, agreed to buy 100% of the holdings of WWRD. On 2 July 2015 the acquisition of WWRD by Fiskars Corporation was completed including the brands Waterford, Wedgwood, Royal Doulton, Royal Albert and Rogaška. The acquisition was approved by US antitrust authorities.

== Cultural references ==
- In the comedy television series Keeping Up Appearances her Royal Doulton china "with the hand-painted periwinkles" was frequently mentioned with great pride by the main character, Hyacinth Bucket.
- A Royal Doulton bowl features prominently in the 2018 film Mary Poppins Returns, and is the basis for the song "The Royal Doulton Music Hall".
- In the James Bond 007 franchise films, Judi Dench's M character has a Royal Doulton's "Jack the Bulldog" figurine on her desk at MI6.

== Notable designers ==
- Hannah and Florence Barlow, two painter sisters
- Leslie Harradine
- Agnete Hoy
- Charles Noke
- Margaret E. Thompson

== Gallery ==
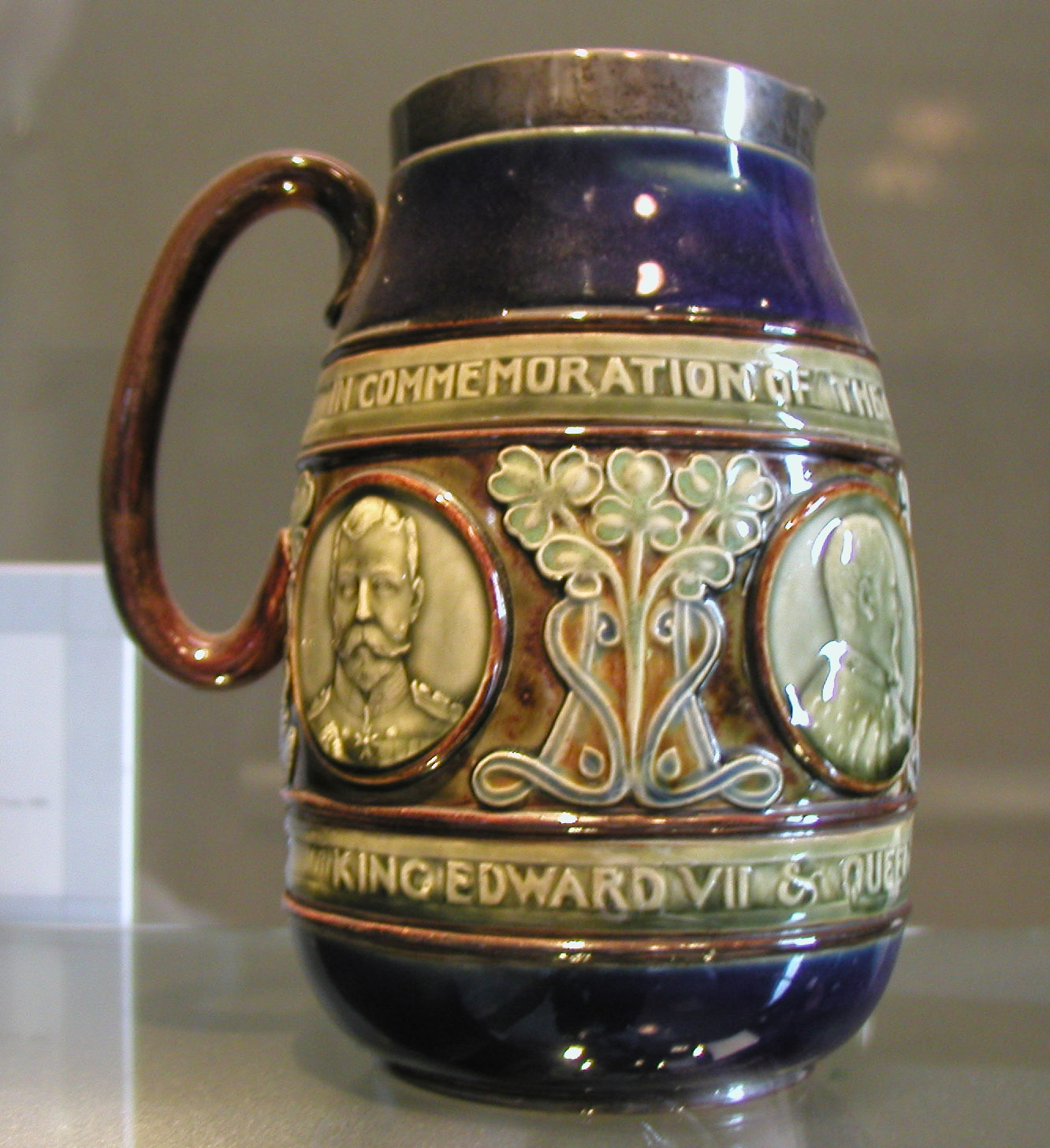
Lambeth stoneware commemorative mug for the Coronation of Edward VII, 1902

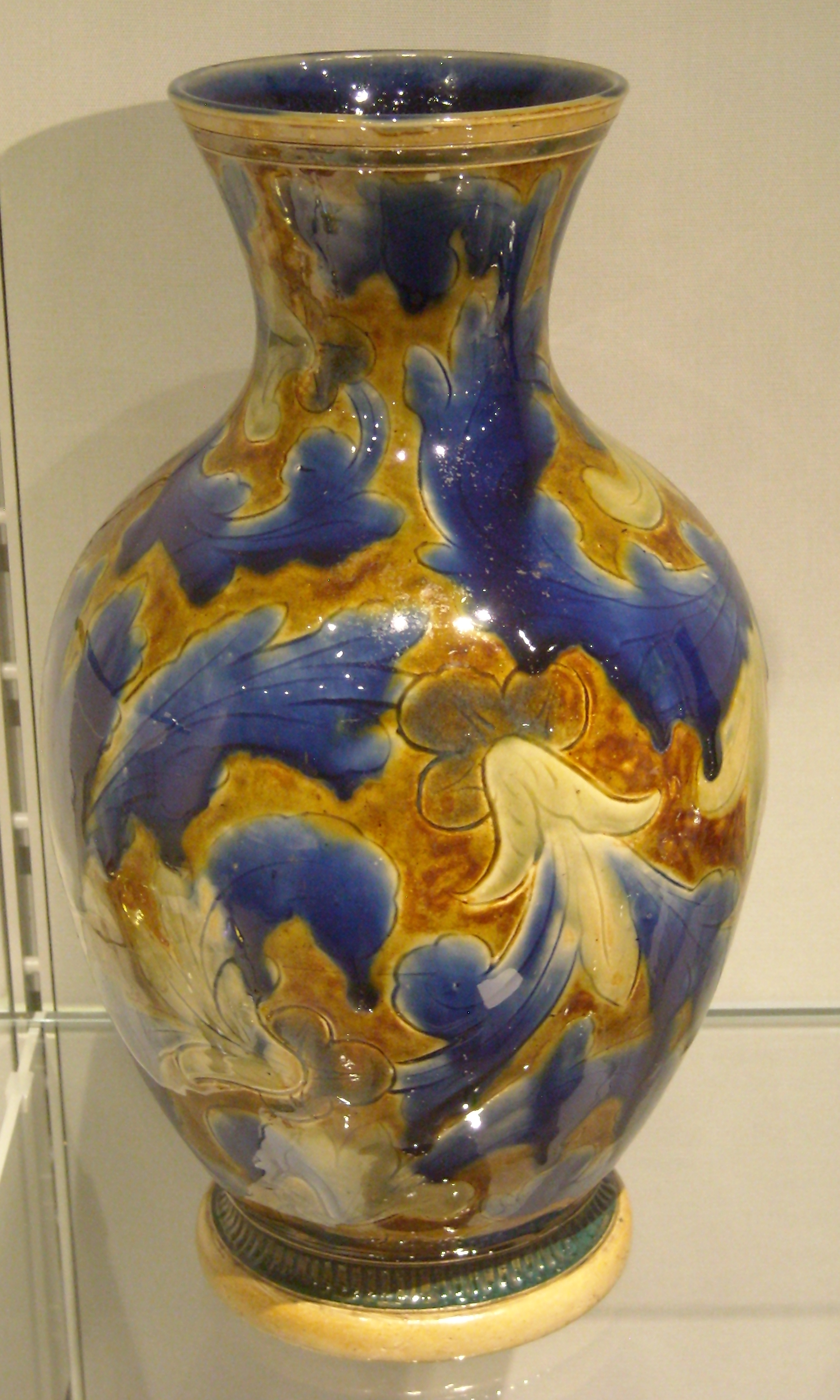
Vase, Lambeth

Modern figure, The Captain

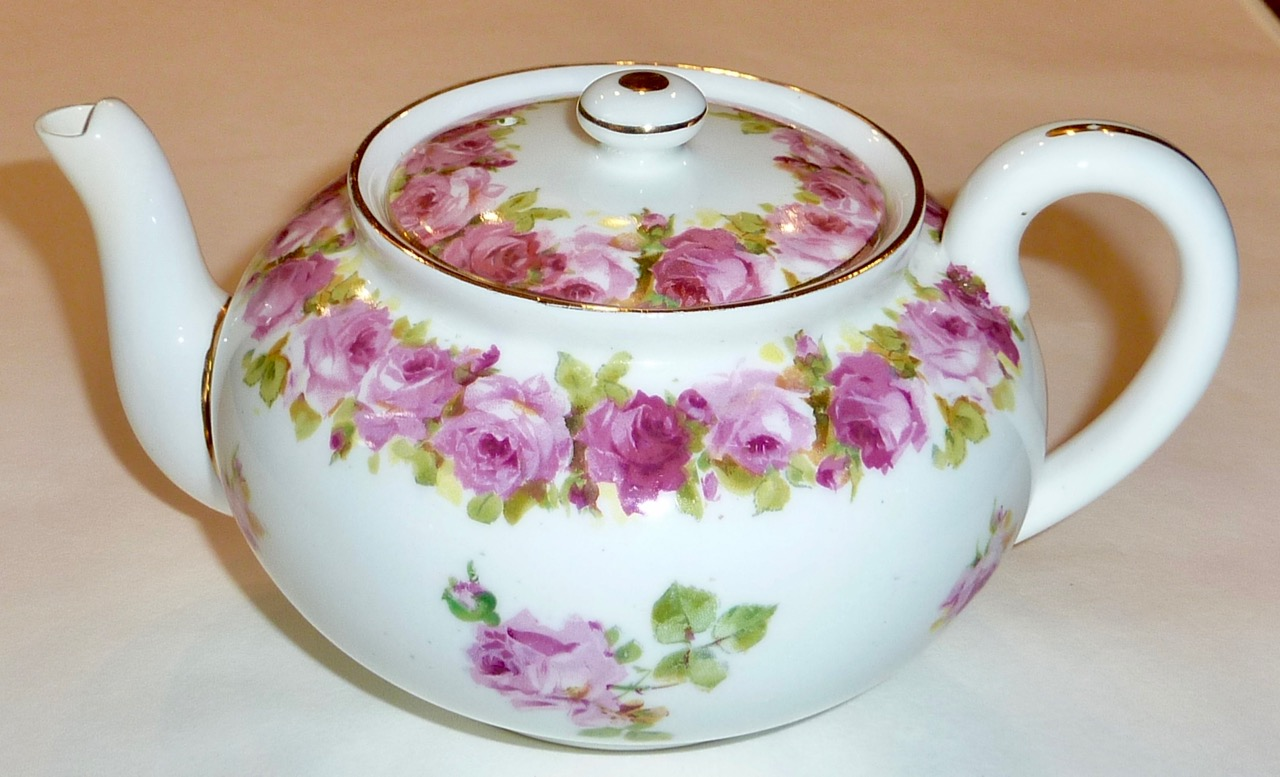
Ruby Rose Teapot

== See also ==
- List of Royal Doulton figurines
- List of Bunnykins figurines
