= Harrowden =

The name Harrowden may refer to:

Places in England

- Harrowden, Bedfordshire, a hamlet
- Great Harrowden, a village in Northamptonshire
- Little Harrowden, a village in Northamptonshire

Peerage titles

- Baron Vaux of Harrowden, a title in the Peerage of England` created in 1523 for Sir Nicholas Vaux
