= Leslie Harradine =

(Arthur) Leslie Harradine (1887–1965) was one of Royal Doulton's premier, and most prolific, figurine modellers from 1920 until the mid-1950s.

== Early life and beginnings with Royal Doulton ==
Born Arthur Leslie Harradine in Lambeth to Charles Percy, a solicitor's clerk, and Jessie Harradine (née Tealby) in 1887, he first joined the Doulton Lambeth studio as an apprentice in 1902 working under George Tinworth while studying part-time at the Camberwell School of Arts. He went on to qualify and work in the Royal Doulton design department. His main interest lay in clay sculpture and the design of free standing figures and he produced several prototypes for these which came to the attention of Charles Noke the Royal Doulton art director in Burslem.

Despite his interest in figure modelling, and his apparent skill in that area, Leslie Harradine was required to design vases for the Lambeth Art Studios for most of his time and this was not something he enjoyed doing. His ambition was to set up his own small modelling studio where he could do the work he loved. At the time this was not possible so he suddenly decided to follow his brother Percy's dream instead

== Emigration to Canada and marriage ==
In 1912 Leslie Harradine left the Royal Doulton studios to emigrate to Canada with his older brother Percy where, together, they purchased land and tried to build up a 4,000 acre (1,619 hectare) farm. The location was isolated, the soil was poor and the work was hard but Leslie enjoyed the life and managed to make a simple living from it. During the little spare time he had, he painted and made models from clay deposits found on his land.

In 1916 the two brothers joined the army and left Canada to fight the Great War in France. After only a short while Leslie Harradine was injured when his horse was shot and he spent a good deal of time in hospital back in England. While there he met his future wife Edith Denton whom he married in 1917, and the following year became a father to his first child Jessie.

Canada did not seem, to Leslie, to be a suitable place for his wife and child so after peace was declared in 1918 he passed his half of the farm to his brother and settled into family life in Luton, Bedfordshire where he had two more daughters and occupied himself by doing bits and pieces of painting and modelling. His dream, once again, was to open a small studio in London.

== Freelance for Royal Doulton and later years ==
Harradine had not been back in England for long when Charles Noke got to hear about him again and set up a meeting. He offered Leslie a job as a figure designer at the Burslem works but he refused. Leslie had grown to like his independence and wanted to work only for himself. He did, however, eventually agree to send Noke some samples of his models on a freelance basis and so, in 1920, the first of his Royal Doulton figures, HN 395, 'Contentment' was released.

Harradine provided a regular supply of figures to Royal Doulton for almost forty years but always on a freelance basis as Leslie was the one to decide what he would model, and when, and he would send these, maybe up to three at a time, on a monthly basis to the Burslem works. It is said that the other designers and painters would all gather round eagerly when his monthly shipment was unpacked to see what he had "come up with this time".

Many popular models flowed from his small home studio. "Polly Peacham" and other figures from his rendition of The Beggars Opera. "The Balloon Seller" and "Flower Sellers Children" from the London street sellers series. The Dickens series, which was a particular favourite of Charles Noke's. and, of course, the slightly risque models of "The Bather" both swimsuit clad and nude.

Leslie Harradine loved children and often displayed his self-taught conjuring skills for their amusement. He produced a series of "Child Studies" which were almost old fashioned in their conception and portrayal but they proved to be very popular with the buying public and stayed in production for many years. Other models, such as "The Rocking Horse" only stayed in production for a year or two and will be quite rare.

Yet another series of child studies, called the "Nursery Rhyme" series, bore a strong similarity to the work of Freda Doughty for Royal Worcester. These were equally popular and also stayed in production for many years.

After the premature death of his first wife in 1935, aged just 46, Leslie remarried two years later to Jane Haley and had a further two daughters and a son by her. He later married for a third time. It is said that "Harradine had a habit of marrying his models and all three wives were his muses." He eventually moved to Sark, a small member of the Channel Islands where no cars are allowed, and continued his modelling career from there. His new creations were shipped to the mainland and then on to the Potteries as before until the late 1950s when he eventually informed Royal Doulton of his intention to retire.

The last of his figures to have been released in the series was HN 2175 "The Beggar" which was a second version of the "Beggars Opera" series. This was released in 1956. Another model, "The Apple Maid" was released in 1957 but this bore an earlier number of HN 2160 and had, presumably, been modelled slightly earlier but taken longer to produce.

== Retirement and death ==
In 1961 he moved to Spain where he lived and modelled local peasants in terra cotta for pleasure. Leslie Harradine died on 6 December 1965, in Gibraltar at age 78; the same age that his former mentor Charles Noke had retired as art director of Doulton, some 30 years prior.
