= Lead glass =

Variety of glass in which lead replaces the calcium content

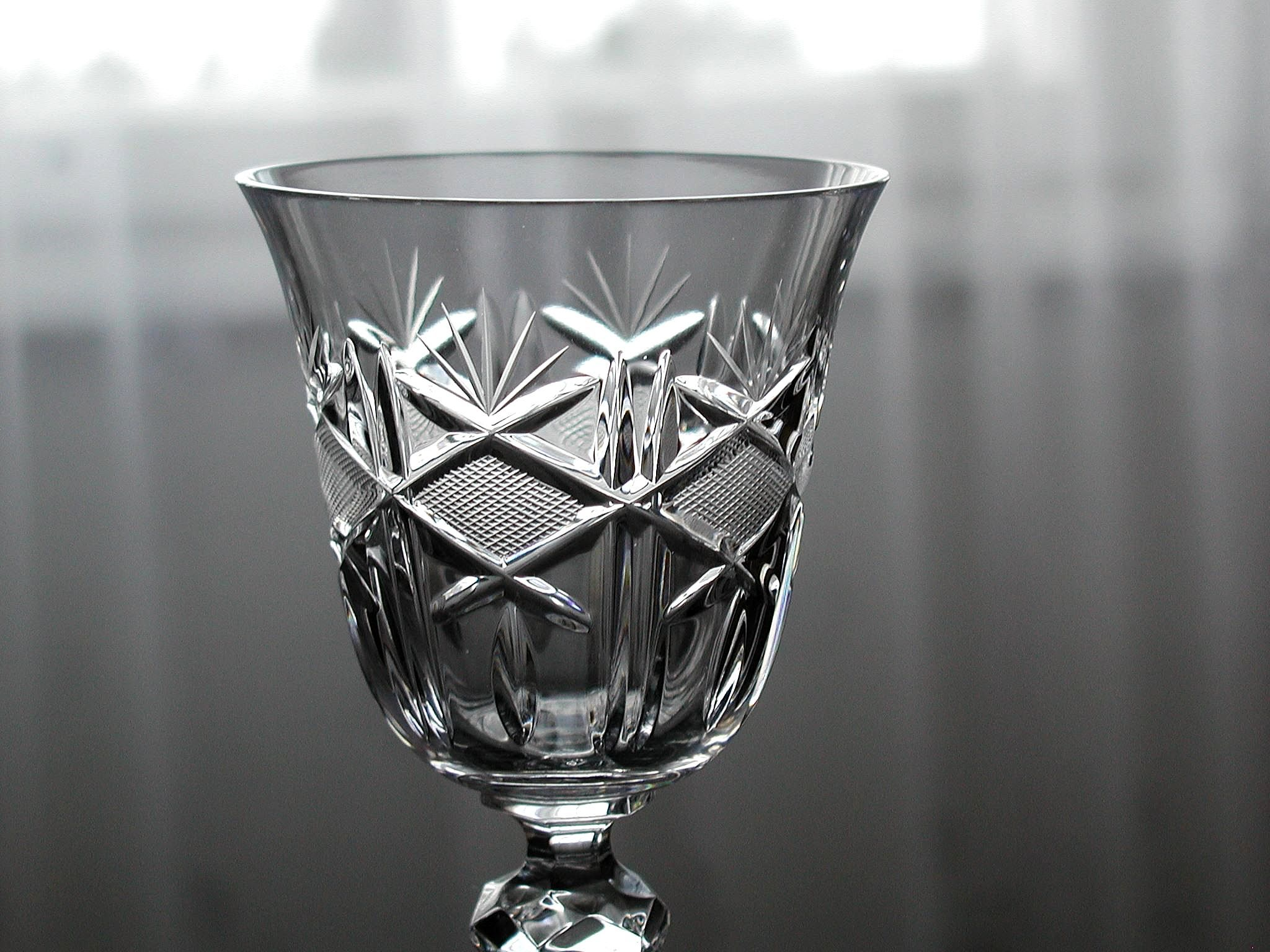
Cut glass wine glass made of lead glass

Lead glass, commonly called crystal, is a variety of glass in which lead replaces the calcium content of a typical potash glass. Lead glass typically contains 18–40% (by mass) lead(II) oxide (PbO); modern lead crystal or leaded crystal (historically also known as flint glass for the original silica source) contains a minimum of 24% PbO. Lead glass is desirable for a variety of uses because of its clarity. In marketing terms it is often called crystal glass.

The term lead crystal is technically not an accurate way to describe lead glass, because glass lacks a crystalline structure and is instead an amorphous solid. The use of the term remains popular for historical and commercial reasons but is sometimes changed to simply crystal because of lead's reputation as a toxic substance. It is retained from the Venetian word cristallo to describe the rock crystal (quartz) imitated by Murano glassmakers. This naming convention has been maintained to the present day to describe decorative hollowware.

Lead crystal glassware was formerly used to store and serve drinks, but the health risks of lead have made this use rare. Lead crystal is unsafe to drink or eat from, as the neurotoxic lead leaches out of the glass and into the food. An alternative material is modern crystal glass, in which barium oxide, zinc oxide, or potassium oxide are employed instead of lead oxide.

In the European Union, labelling of "crystal" products is regulated by Council Directive 69/493/EEC, which defines four categories, depending on the chemical composition and properties of the material. Only glass products containing at least 24% lead oxide may be referred to as "lead crystal". Products with less lead oxide, and glass products with other metal oxides used in place of lead oxide, must be labelled "crystalline" or "crystal glass".

== Properties ==
The addition of lead(II) oxide to glass raises its refractive index and lowers its working temperature and viscosity. The attractive optical properties of lead glass result from the high content of the heavy metal lead, which raises the density of the glass. The density of soda-lime glass is 2.4 g/cm^{3} (1.4 oz/cu in) or below, while typical lead crystal has a density of around 3.1 g/cm^{3} (1.8 oz/cu in) and high-lead glass can be over 4.0 g/cm^{3} (2.3 oz/cu in) or even up to 5.9 g/cm^{3} (3.4 oz/cu in).

Ordinary glass has a refractive index of 1.5, while the addition of lead produces a range of 1.7 to 1.8, which increases dispersion (a measure of the degree to which a medium separates light into its component wavelengths), thus producing a spectrum of colors as a prism does. Crystal cutting techniques exploit these properties to create a brilliant, sparkling effect as each facet in cut glass reflects and transmits light through the object. The high refractive index is useful for lens making, since a given focal length can be achieved with a thinner lens. However, the dispersion must be corrected by other components of the lens system if the lens is to be achromatic.

The addition of PbO to potash glass reduces its viscosity, rendering it more fluid than ordinary soda glass above its softening temperature (about 600 °C or 1,112 °F), with a working point of 800 °C (1,470 °F). The viscosity of glass varies radically with temperature, but that of lead glass is roughly two orders of magnitude lower than that of ordinary soda glasses across working temperature ranges (up to 1,100 °C or 2,010 °F). From the glassmaker's perspective, this results in two practical effects. First, lead glass may be worked at a lower temperature, facilitating its use in enamelling; second, clear vessels may be made without trapped air bubbles with less difficulty than with ordinary glasses, allowing the manufacture of perfectly clear, flawless objects.

When tapped, lead crystal makes a ringing sound, unlike ordinary glasses. Wine glasses made of lead glass are valued for the "ring" made by the clinking of glasses. The sound was considered better when a large quantity of PbO was present in the glassmaking material, as in the British and Irish wine glasses of the 17th-19th centuries, with their "rich bell-notes of F and G sharp". Consumers still rely on this property to distinguish lead glass from cheaper glasses. Emil Deeg had published a major study on the ringing of the lead crystal in 1958. Since the potassium ions are bound more tightly in a lead-silica matrix than in a soda–lime glass, the matrix absorbs more energy when struck. This causes the lead crystal to oscillate, thereby producing its characteristic sound. Lead also increases the solubility of tin, copper, and antimony, leading to its use in colored enamels and glazes. The low viscosity of lead glass melt is the reason for typically high PbO content in the glass solders.

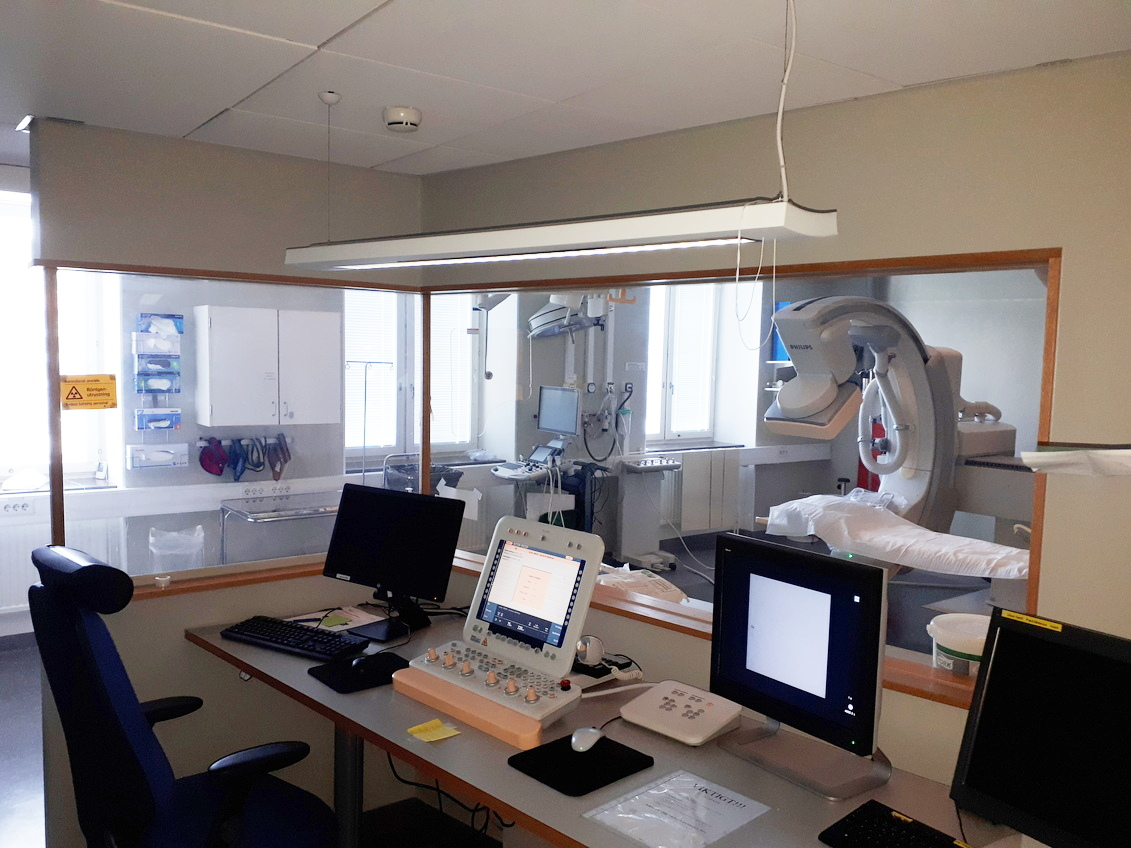
Fluoroscopy room with control space separated by lead shielding glass

The presence of lead is used in glasses absorbing gamma radiation and X-rays, used in radiation shielding as a form of lead shielding (e.g. in cathode-ray tubes, thus lowering the exposure of the viewer to soft X-rays). In particle physics, the combination of the low radiation length resulting from the high density and presence of heavy nuclei with the high refractive index which leads to both pronounced Cherenkov radiation and containment of the Cherenkov light by total internal reflection makes lead glass one of the prominent tools for photon detection by means of electromagnetic showers.

The high ionic radius of the Pb^{2+} ion renders it highly immobile in the matrix and hinders the movement of other ions; lead glasses therefore have high electrical resistance, about two orders of magnitude higher than soda–lime glass (10^{8.5} vs 10^{6.5} ohm·cm, DC at 250 °C or 482 °F). Lead-containing glass is frequently used in light fixtures.

Use	PbO by weight (%)
Household "crystal" leaded glass	18–38
Ceramic glazes and vitreous enamels	16–35
High refractive index optical glasses	4–65
Radiation shielding	2–28
High electrical resistance	20–22
Glass solders and sealants	56–77

== History ==
Lead may be introduced into glass either as an ingredient of the primary melt or as an addition to preformed leadless glass or frit. The PbO used in lead glass can be obtained from a variety of sources. In Europe, galena – lead sulfide – was widely available and could be smelted to produce metallic lead. The lead metal was calcined to form PbO by roasting it and scraping off the litharge. In the medieval period lead metal could be obtained through recycling from abandoned Roman sites and plumbing, including from church roofs. Metallic lead was demanded in quantity for silver cupellation, and the resulting litharge could be used directly by glassmakers. Lead was also used for ceramic lead glazes. This material interdependence suggests a close working relationship between potters, glassmakers, and metalworkers.

Glasses with PbO content first appeared in Mesopotamia, the birthplace of the glass industry. The earliest known example is a blue glass fragment from Nippur dated to 1400 BC containing 3.66% PbO. Glass is mentioned in clay tablets from the reign of Assurbanipal (668–631 BC), and a recipe for lead glaze appears in a Babylonian tablet of 1700 BC. A red sealing-wax cake found in the Burnt Palace at Nimrud, from the early 6th century BC, contains 10% PbO. These low values suggest that PbO may not have been consciously added and was certainly not used as the primary fluxing agent in ancient glasses.

Lead glass occurs in Han-period China (206 BC – 220 AD) where it was cast to imitate jade, both for ritual objects such as big and small figures, as well as jewellery and a limited range of vessels. Since glass first occurs at such a late date in China, it is thought that the technology was brought along the Silk Road by glassworkers from the Middle East. The fundamental compositional difference between Western silica-natron glass and the unique Chinese lead glass, however, may indicate an autonomous development.

In medieval and early modern Europe, lead glass was used as a base in coloured glasses, specifically in mosaic tesserae, enamels, stained-glass painting, and bijouterie, where it was used to imitate precious stones. Several textual sources describing lead glass survive. In the late 11th–early 12th century, Schedula Diversarum Artium (List of Sundry Crafts), the author known as "Theophilus Presbyter" describes its use as imitation gemstone, and the title of a lost chapter of the work mentions the use of lead in glass. The 12–13th century pseudonymous "Heraclius" details the manufacture of lead enamel and its use for window painting in his De coloribus et artibus Romanorum (Of Hues and Crafts of the Romans). This refers to lead glass as "Jewish glass", perhaps indicating its transmission to Europe. A manuscript preserved in the Biblioteca Marciana, Venice, describes the use of lead oxide in enamels and includes recipes for calcining lead to form the oxide. Lead glass was ideally suited for enamelling vessels and windows owing to its lower working temperature than the forest glass of the body.

Antonio Neri devoted book four of his L'Arte Vetraria ("The Art of Glass-making", 1612) to lead glass. In this first systematic treatise on glass, he again refers to the use of lead glass in enamels, glassware, and for the imitation of precious stones. Christopher Merrett translated this into English in 1662 (The Art of Glass), paving the way for the production of English lead crystal glass by George Ravenscroft. Ravenscroft was the first to produce clear lead crystal glassware on an industrial scale. The son of a merchant with close ties to Venice, Ravenscroft had the cultural and financial resources necessary to revolutionise the glass trade, setting the basis from which England overtook Venice and Bohemia as the centre of the glass industry in the 18th and 19th centuries. With the aid of Venetian glassmakers, especially da Costa, and under the auspices of the Worshipful Company of Glass Sellers of London, Ravenscroft sought to find an alternative to Venetian cristallo. His use of flint as the silica source has led to the term flint glass to describe these crystal glasses, despite his later switch to sand. At first, his glasses tended to crizzle, developing a network of small cracks destroying its transparency, which was eventually overcome by replacing some of the potash flux with PbO to the melt, up to 30%. Crizzling results from the destruction of the glass network by an excess of alkali and may be caused by excess humidity as well as inherent defects in glass composition. He was granted a protective patent in 1673, where production moved from his glasshouse in the precinct of the Savoy, London, to the seclusion of Henley-on-Thames. In 1676, having apparently overcome the crizzling problem, Ravenscroft was granted the use of a raven's head seal as a guaranty of quality. In 1681, the year of his death, the patent expired, and operations quickly developed among several firms, where by 1696, 27 of the 88 glasshouses in England, especially at London and Bristol, were producing flint glass containing 30–35% PbO.

At this period, glass was sold by weight, and the typical forms were rather heavy and solid with minimal decoration. Such was its success on the international market, however, that in 1746, the British government imposed a lucrative tax by weight. Rather than drastically reduce the lead content of their glass, manufacturers responded by creating highly decorated, smaller, more delicate forms, often with hollow stems, known to collectors today as excise glasses. In 1780, the government granted Ireland free trade in glass without taxation. English labour and capital then shifted to Dublin and Belfast, and new glassworks specialising in cut glass were installed in Cork and Waterford. In 1825, the tax was renewed, and gradually the industry declined until the mid-19th century, when the tax was repealed.

From the 18th century, English lead glass became popular throughout Europe and was ideally suited to the new taste for wheel-cut glass decoration perfected on the Continent owing to its relatively soft properties. In Holland, local engraving masters such as Frans Greenwood and David Wolff stippled imported English glassware, a style that remained popular through the 18th century. Such was its popularity in Holland that the first Continental production of lead-crystal glass began there, probably as the result of imported English workers. Imitating lead-crystal à la façon d'Angleterre presented technical difficulties, as the best results were obtained with covered pots in a coal-fired furnace, a particularly English process requiring specialised cone furnaces. Towards the end of the 18th century, lead-crystal glass was being produced in France, Hungary, Germany, and Norway. By 1800, Irish lead crystal had overtaken lime-potash glasses on the Continent, and traditional glassmaking centres in Bohemia began to focus on colored glasses rather than compete directly against it.

The development of lead glass continued through the 20th century, when in 1932 scientists at the Corning Glassworks in New York developed a lead glass of high optical clarity. This became the focus of Steuben Glass Works, a division of Corning, which produced decorative vases, bowls, and glasses in Art Deco style. Lead crystal continues to be used in industrial and decorative applications.

== Lead glazes ==
The fluxing and refractive properties valued for lead glass also make it attractive as a pottery or ceramic glaze. Lead glazes first appear in 1st century BC to 1st century AD Roman wares and occur nearly simultaneously in China. They were very high in lead, 45–60% PbO, with a very low alkali content, less than 2%. From the Roman period, they remained popular through the Byzantine and Islamic periods in the Near East, on pottery vessels and tiles throughout medieval Europe and up to the present day. In China, similar glazes were used from the 12th century for colored enamels on stoneware and on porcelain from the 14th century. These could be applied in three different ways. Lead could be added directly to a ceramic body in the form of a lead compound in suspension, either from galena (PbS), red lead (Pb_{3}O_{4}), white lead (2PbCO_{3}·Pb(OH)_{2}), or PbO. The second method involves mixing the lead compound with silica, which is then placed in suspension and applied directly. The third method involves fritting the lead compound with silica, powdering the mixture, and suspending and applying it. The method used on a particular vessel may be deduced by analysing the interaction layer between the glaze and the ceramic body microscopically.

Tin-opacified glazes appear in Iraq in the 8th century. Originally containing 1–2% PbO; by the 11th century high-lead glazes had developed, typically containing 20–40% PbO and 5–12% alkali. These were used throughout Europe and the Near East, especially in Iznik ware, and continue to be used today. Glazes with higher lead content occur in Spanish and Italian maiolica, with up to 55% PbO and as low as 3% alkali. Adding lead to the melt allows the formation of tin oxide more readily than in an alkali glaze: tin oxide precipitates into crystals in the glaze as it cools, creating its opacity.

The use of lead glaze has several advantages over alkali glazes in addition to their greater optical refractivity. Lead compounds in suspension may be added directly to the ceramic body. Alkali glazes must first be mixed with silica and fritted prior to use, since they are soluble in water, requiring additional labor. A successful glaze must not crawl, or peel away from the pottery surface upon cooling, leaving areas of unglazed ceramic. Lead reduces this risk by reducing the surface tension of the glaze. It must not craze, forming a network of cracks, caused when the thermal contraction of the glaze and the ceramic body do not match properly. Ideally, the glaze contraction should be 5–15% less than the body contraction, as glazes are stronger under compression than under tension. A high-lead glaze has a linear expansion coefficient of between 5 and 7×10^{−6}/°C, compared to 9 to 10×10^{−6}/°C for alkali glazes. Those of earthenware ceramics vary between 3 and 5×10^{−6}/°C for non-calcareous bodies and 5 to 7×10^{−6}/°C for calcareous clays, or those containing 15–25% CaO. Therefore, the thermal contraction of lead glaze matches that of the ceramic more closely than an alkali glaze, rendering it less prone to crazing. A glaze should also have a low enough viscosity to prevent the formation of pinholes as trapped gasses escape during firing, typically between 900 and 1100 °C, but not so low as to run off. The relatively low viscosity of lead glaze mitigates this issue. It may also have been cheaper to produce than alkali glazes. Lead glass and glazes have a long and complex history, and continue to play new roles in industry and technology today.

== Manufacturers ==
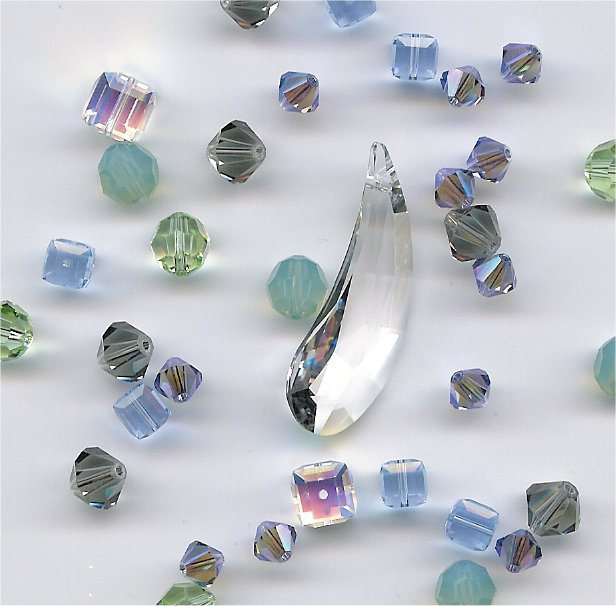
Lead crystal beads

Makers of lead crystal objects include:

Name	Polity	Production began	Notes
NovaScotian Crystal	Canada	1996	Production discontinued March 2021
Gus Crystal	Russia	1756	Production continued
Baccarat	France	1816	Part of the Starwood Capital Group since 2005
Saint-Louis	France	1781	Part of Hermès since 1989
Lalique	France	1920s	Part of the Art & Fragrance since 2011
Daum	France	1878	Part of Financiere Saint-Germain since 2009 after bankruptcy in 2003
Arc International	France	1968	Production of Crystal D'Arque ended in 2009; restarted in 2010 as lead-free Diamax.
Dartington Crystal	England	1967	Management buy out in 2006.
Cumbria Crystal	England	1976	Last remaining Luxury Cut Crystal producer in the UK.
Royal Brierley	England	1776	Trademark of the Dartington Crystal since 2006
Waterford Crystal	Republic of Ireland	1783	WWRD Holdings of KPS Capital Partners after bankruptcy in 2009.
Galway Crystal	Republic of Ireland		
Tipperary Crystal	Republic of Ireland	1987	Founded by former Waterford Crystal craftsmen.
Cavan Crystal	Republic of Ireland		
Tyrone Crystal	Northern Ireland	1971	Factory closed 2010
Dingle Crystal	Republic of Ireland	1998	
Edinburgh Crystal	Scotland	1867	Trademark of the WWRD Holdings after bankruptcy in 2006
Hadeland Glassverk	Norway	1765	Production continued
Kristal Samobor	Croatia	1839	Production continued
Magnor Glassverk	Norway	1830	Production continued
Orrefors glassworks	Sweden	1913	Part of the Swedish glassworks group Orrefors Kosta Boda AB since 2005
Kosta Boda	Sweden	1742	Part of the Swedish glassworks group Orrefors Kosta Boda AB since 2005
Holmegaard Glass Factory	Denmark	1825	Production ceased in 2009
Val Saint Lambert	Belgium	1826	Sold to Onclin winemaker family for $5M in 2008
Mozart Crystal	Brazil	2018	Production continued
Royal Leerdam Crystal	Netherlands	1765	Merged with porcelain factory De Koninklijke Porceleyne Fles in 2008
Zwiesel Kristallglas	Germany	1872	Management buy out at Schott AG in 2001. Only crystal manufacturer in Germany
Nachtmann	Germany	1834	Trademark of the Riedel wine glass company since 2004
Riedel wine glass company	Austria	1756	World leading wine glass manufacturer
Swarovski	Austria	1895	Production continued
Ajka crystal	Hungary	1878	In 1991 opened porcelain studio
Moser	Czech Republic	1857	Production continued
Rückl	Czech Republic	1846	Production continued
Crystalex	Czech Republic	1948	Production continued
Preciosa	Czech Republic	1948	Production continued
Lasvit	Czech Republic	2008	Production continued
Steuben Glass	United States	1903	Sold by Corning Incorporated to the Schottenstein Stores Corp. in 2008. In 2008 Schottenstein closed factory
Rogaška	Slovenia	1927	Production continued
Hoya	Japan	1945	Closed in 2009
Mikasa	Japan	1970s	Sold by the Arc International to Lifetime Brands in 2008
Liuligongfang	Taiwan	1987	Production continued
Asfour crystal	Egypt	1961	Production continued

== Safety ==
Several studies have demonstrated that serving food or drink in glassware containing PbO can cause lead to leach into the contents, even when the glassware has not been used for storage. Due to an inability to "indicate a threshold for the key effects of lead," a 2011 World Health Organization committee on food additives "concluded that it was not possible to establish a new PTWI (provisional tolerable weekly intake) that would be considered health protective."

The amount of lead released from lead glass increases with the acidity of the substance being served. Vinegar, for example, has been shown to cause more rapid leaching compared to white wine, as vinegar is more acidic. Citrus juices and other acidic drinks leach lead from crystal as effectively as alcoholic beverages. Daily usage of lead crystalware (without longer-term storage) was found to add up to 14.5 μg of lead from drinking a 350ml cola beverage.

The amount of lead released into a food or drink increases with the amount of time it stays in the vessel. In a study performed at North Carolina State University, the amount of lead migration was measured for port wine stored in lead crystal decanters. After two days, lead levels were 89 μg/L (micrograms per liter). After four months, lead levels were between 2,000 and 5,000 μg/L. White wine doubled its lead content within an hour of storage and tripled it within four hours. Some brandy stored in lead crystal for over five years had lead levels around 20,000 μg/L. Lead leaching from the same decanter decreases with repeated uses. This finding is "consistent with ceramic chemistry theory, which predicts that leaching of lead from crystal is self-limiting exponentially as a function of increasing distance from the crystal-liquid interface."

It has been proposed that the historic association of gout with the upper classes in Europe and America was, in part, caused by the extensive use of lead crystal decanters to store fortified wines and whisky. Statistical evidence linking gout to lead poisoning has been published.

== See also ==
- Hot cell
- List of indices of refraction

== Sources ==
- Deeg, Emil (1958). "Zusammenhang zwischen Feinbau und mechanisch akustischen Eigenschaften einfacher Silikatgläser" [Relationship between Fine Structure and Mechanical-Acoustical Properties of Single Silicate Glasses]. Glastechnische Berichte [Glass science and technology] (in German). 31 (6). Deutsche Glastechnische Gesellschaft: 1–9, 85–93, 124-, 229-. ISSN 0946-7475.
- Kurkjian, Charles R.; Kieffer, John (2001). "Elastic Properties of Glasses". Handbook of Elastic Properties of Solids, Liquids, and Gases. Elsevier. doi:10.1016/b978-012445760-7/50047-2. ISBN 978-0-12-445760-7.
- Visser, M. (2015). https://books.google.com/books?id=aPmGAwAAQBAJ&pg=RA2-PA5. The Rituals of Dinner: The Origins, Evolution, Eccentricities, and Meaning of Table Manners. Open Road Media. ISBN 978-1-5040-1169-3.
