= Georg Riedel =

Georg Riedel may refer to:

- Georg Riedel (Altstadt Kantor) (1676–1738) Kantor at the Altstadt church, Königsberg, who composed oratorios of Gospel of Matthew and Revelation
- Georg Riedel (jazz musician) (1934–2024), composer of music for Astrid Lindgren movies
- Georg Riedel (glass manufacturer), Austrian wine glass manufacturer
  - Georg Josef Riedel (born 1949), 10th-generation owner of Riedel
