= Maximilian Riedel =

Austrian glassmaker and businessman (born 1977)

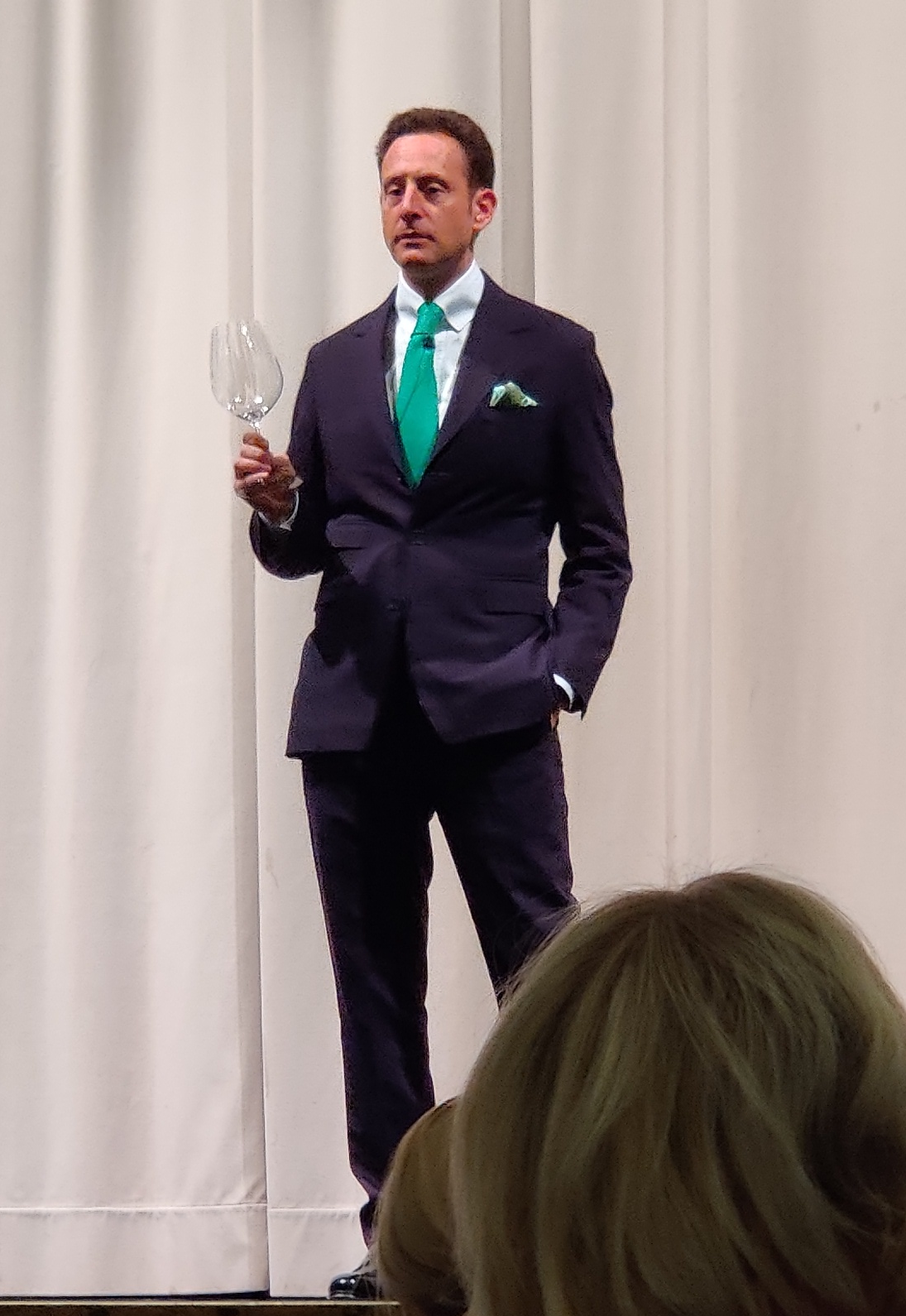
Riedel in Helsinki in 2019

Maximilian Josef Riedel (born September 13, 1977) is an Austrian glassmaker and businessman. Born in Vienna, he is the 11th-generation CEO and President of Riedel, a glassware manufacturer established in 1756 and best known for its production of grape variety-specific glassware. Riedel is best known for designing the world's first variety-specific stemless wine glasses (the Riedel “O” Series) in 2004, expanding the company to international markets.

== Early life ==
Maximilian Josef Riedel was born in 1977 to Georg Josef Riedel and Eva Riedel in Vienna, Austria, 400 km from Riedel Crystal headquarters in Kufstein, Austria. He has an older sister named Laetizia Riedel-Rothlisberger.

=== Career ===
In 1995, at age 18, Maximilian Riedel served eight months in the Austria Bundesheer where he was involved in humanitarian work. At 18 he also began apprenticing his father Georg Riedel at Riedel Crystal, who had learned glassmaking and the family business from his father, Claus Josef Riedel, the first to discover that the shape, size and color of glassware affect how we enjoy wine, and developer of the world's first-ever variety-specific glasses in 1958. He trained in sales and administration.

In 1997, at age 20, Maximilian Riedel joined Riedel Crystal and was in charge of development and finance while also working in the company's advertising office.

In the late 1990s, Maximilian Riedel introduced Riedel Crystal to the Dubai market, and spent two years in Paris at Riedel's French importer, Ercuis, where he managed sales and conducted Riedel comparative glassware tastings. While there he also researched how he could help build the brand and increase sales.

In 2000, at the age of 23, Riedel moved to the United States to become the Executive Vice President of Riedel Crystal's North American branch. In 2002, at age 25, Maximilian Riedel became CEO of Riedel Crystal of North America. In his time as CEO of Riedel Crystal of North America, he was able to quadruple the company's sales in the United States and Canada while also making the continent Riedel's largest export market. Maximilian Riedel assisted in the company's growth by creating partnerships with Celebrity Cruises, Lindt, and Miele, which introduced the brand to new consumer segments.

In 2004, Riedel Crystal bought the German-based glass manufacturer F.X. Nachtmann, which included both the Nachtmann decorative and wine glassware brand and the Spiegelau beer and wine glassware brand, and in 2005, Maximilian Riedel launched Nachtmann's crystal giftware in the U.S. market. In 2007, he successfully reinvigorated Nachtmann through collaboration with leading international design schools as part of the NexGen student design competition. Through this program, Maximilian Riedel challenges design students to reimagine Nachtmann's aesthetic in their own vision, guiding their product development as mentor, and awarding one student the opportunity to bring his concept to market. Since 2007, the NexGen program has partnered with Parsons The New School for Design in New York (2008), the Pratt Institute in New York (2010), Konstfack, University College of Arts, Crafts and Design in Stockholm (2011), the Musashino Art University in Tokyo (2013), and the Academy of Arts, Architecture and Design in Prague (2014). In October 2012, Maximilian Riedel was honored by the Pratt Institute as a Pratt Legend for his continued work with design students.

In July 2013, former Riedel Crystal CEO Georg Riedel handed over management of Riedel Crystal and its worldwide subsidiaries to Maximilian Riedel, naming him company President and CEO. Today, Riedel Crystal is managed jointly by the two, who travel the world to educate over 20,000 people annually on variety-specific stemware.

== Design Contributions ==
- 2004: Developed the first variety-specific stemless wine glasses as part of his “O” Series. Riedel was inspired to create the series while pressed for cabinet space while living in a New York City apartment. His intent was to design variety-specific wine glasses that were space efficient and stackable. The “O” Series has become Riedel Crystal's most successful new collection in the company's history. Today, the “O” collection has grown to include seventeen glass designs including six variety-specific wine glass shapes, sparkling wine, spirits, water, Coca-Cola, and martini cocktails. In 2006, the Corning Museum of Glass selected the “O” Chardonnay glass for its permanent collection and in 2011, the same glass was prominently featured in “How Wine Became Modern,”an exhibition on the impact of design on the wine culture at the San Francisco Museum of Modern Art.
- 2008: Developed the “double-decanting” technology, which achieves hours of decanting in a matter of minutes. Maximilian Riedel included this technology in many of his decanter designs, including the Eve, a cobra-inspired decanter that started the “double-decanting” trend.
- 2011: Developed the Riedel Restaurant and Restaurant Sommeliers Series, which provide the company's glassware at lower cost and greater durability to restaurants and hotels.

=== Glassware Design Timeline ===
- (2004) “O” Series
- (2011) Riedel Restaurant
- (2011) Key to Wine
- (2014) Big “O”

=== Decanter Design Timeline ===
- (2003) Cornetto
- (2006) “O” Single
- (2008) Eve
- (2011) Mamba
- (2012) Cobra Verde
- (2013) Boa
- (2014) Apple and Big Apple
- (2014) Titano Boa
- (2014) Horse

== Awards ==
- 2005: Good Design Award (Chicago), “O” Thumbs Up Decanter, Chicago Athenaeum
- 2005: Good Design Award (Chicago), “O” Stemless Tasting Glass, Chicago Athenaeum
- 2006: Special guest of Honor, High Museum Atlanta Wine Auction
- 2006: Tastemaker, House & Garden (magazine)
- 2007: Entronisation at the Fête de La Fleur Vin Expo
- 2007: Appreciation Award Orange County Wine Society
- 2008: Good Design Award (Chicago), Swan Decanter
- 2008: Corporate Leadership Award, Living Beyond Breast Cancer
- 2009: Red Dot Design Award, Swan Decanter
- 2011: Good Design Award (Chicago), Mamba Decanter
- 2011: Grand Prix Table & Gift awards for Design, Innovation & Technicality, Mamba Decanter, Maison & Objet, Paris
- 2011: Wine Enthusiast Wine Star Special Award for Generations of Innovation
- 2012: Pratt Institute Legacy Award

== Publications ==
Since coming to the United States, Maximilian has been profiled in publications such as Food & Wine, The New York Times, The Wall Street Journal, Bloomberg Television, Traditional Home, The Miami Herald, Business 2.0, House & Garden (magazine), Fortune (magazine), Worth (magazine), among others. In 2004, Maximilian was featured on the cover of Wine Enthusiast Magazine for an article about his role in the family business.
