= Stevens & Williams =

English glass company

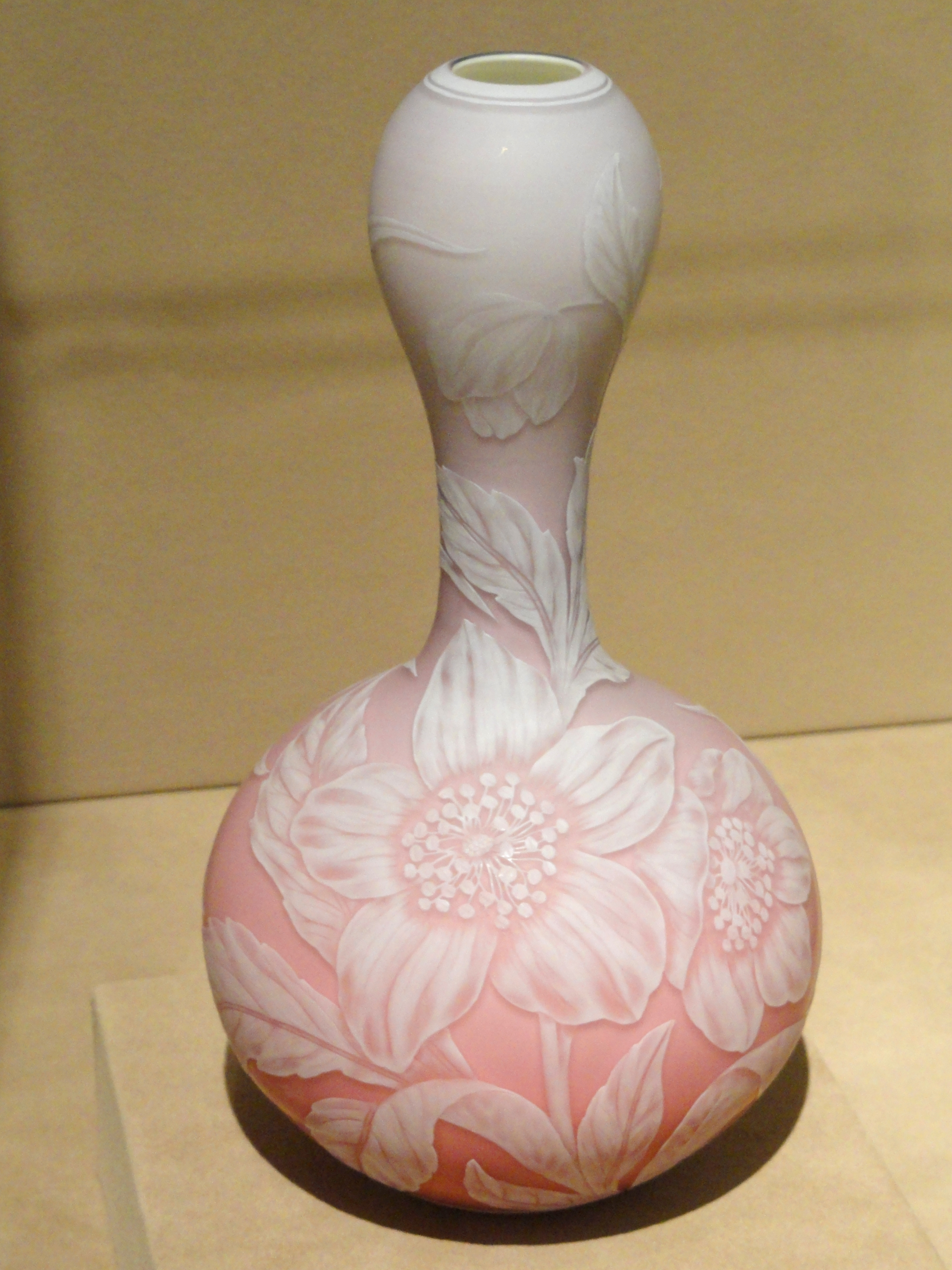
Stevens & Williams vase, circa 1890

Stevens & Williams was an English glass company located in Stourbridge, established in 1776 under the name of Honeybourne. It is one of the oldest crystal glass brands in England. In the late 1930s it became known as Royal Brierley, and mostly made fine cut glass ("cut crystal" for marketing purposes) brand. It is now owned by Dartington Crystal and based in North Devon.

Its most notable cameo glass dated from the 1880s when the studio was under the direction of John Northwood. He was also known for the very unusual and complex Moss agate glass vases.

Other engravers at the Stevens & Williams company included Joshua Hodgetts (1858 -1933) and Frederick Carder (1864-1963), who worked at Stevens & Williams between 1881 and 1902. Carder also founded the Steuben Glass Works in Corning, New York in 1903.
