= Marcus Notley =

Irish industrial designer

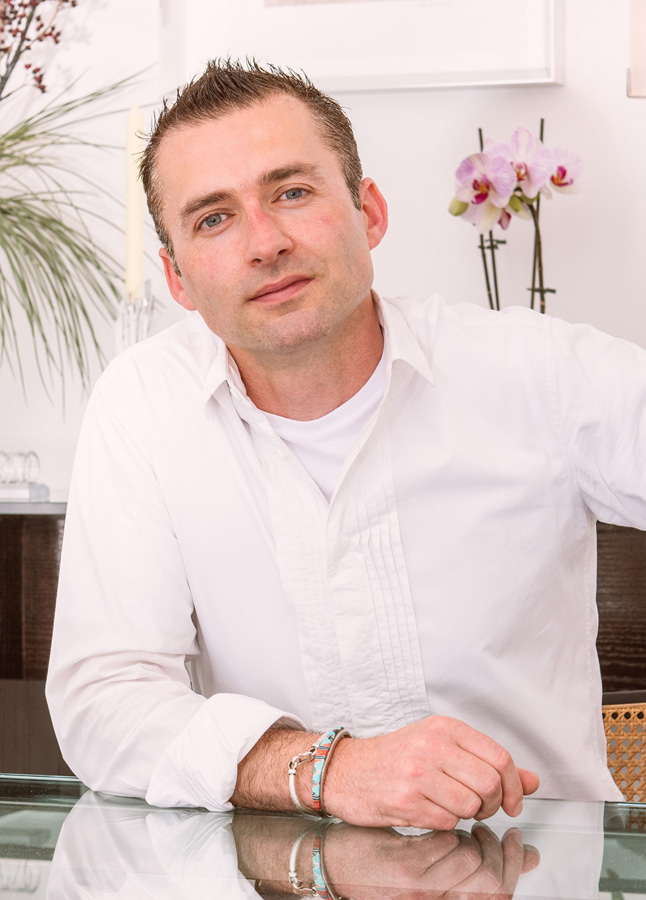
- Notley in 2015
- Education: University of Limerick Politecnico di Milano, Italy National College of Art and Design, Dublin
- Occupation: Product Designer
- Notable work: Ireland's largest crystal chandelier
- Style: sculpted elegance
- Spouse: Nicola Notley
- Children: 2 daughters
- Website: www.behance.net/marcusnotley www.marcusnotley.com

Marcus Notley (born 1 June 1973) is an Irish product designer specializing in designing consumer products for the home. He designed Ireland's largest crystal chandelier for the Merchant Hotel in Belfast.

== Biography ==
Notley grew up in rural County Leitrim. In 1995 he qualified as a product designer (industrial designer) jointly from the University of Limerick and from the National College of Art and Design in Dublin.

He returned to Ireland in 1997, where he commenced working as a lighting designer for Waterford Crystal, designing large bespoke chandeliers for some of the world's most luxurious hotels and private homes. While there he collaborated with international fashion designer John Rocha to develop the John Rocha at Waterford Lighting collection. This collection won the UK Decorative Lighting Awards in 1999. One of the designs also notably featured in the set of the Lara Croft: Tomb Raider movie.

Notley set up his own product design business in 2001. He was approached by Tipperary Crystal to collaborate with Louise Kennedy on expanding her crystal range for them. Over the next eight years they designed over 100 new crystal products together, including chandeliers, stemware, tableware and giftware. In 2004 Tipperary Crystal introduced a crystal stemware and tableware range by Marcus Notley.

In 2002 he started his first project with Waterford Stanley. He helped them redesign their Brandon cast iron cooker range.

In 2005 he launched a range of Marcus Notley porcelain tableware sold on QVC. He then went on to work with an Irish cookware company La Cuisine to design cast iron cookware.

He has been a National College of Art and Design visiting lecturer and has been an organiser of a number of Design Week events in Ireland.

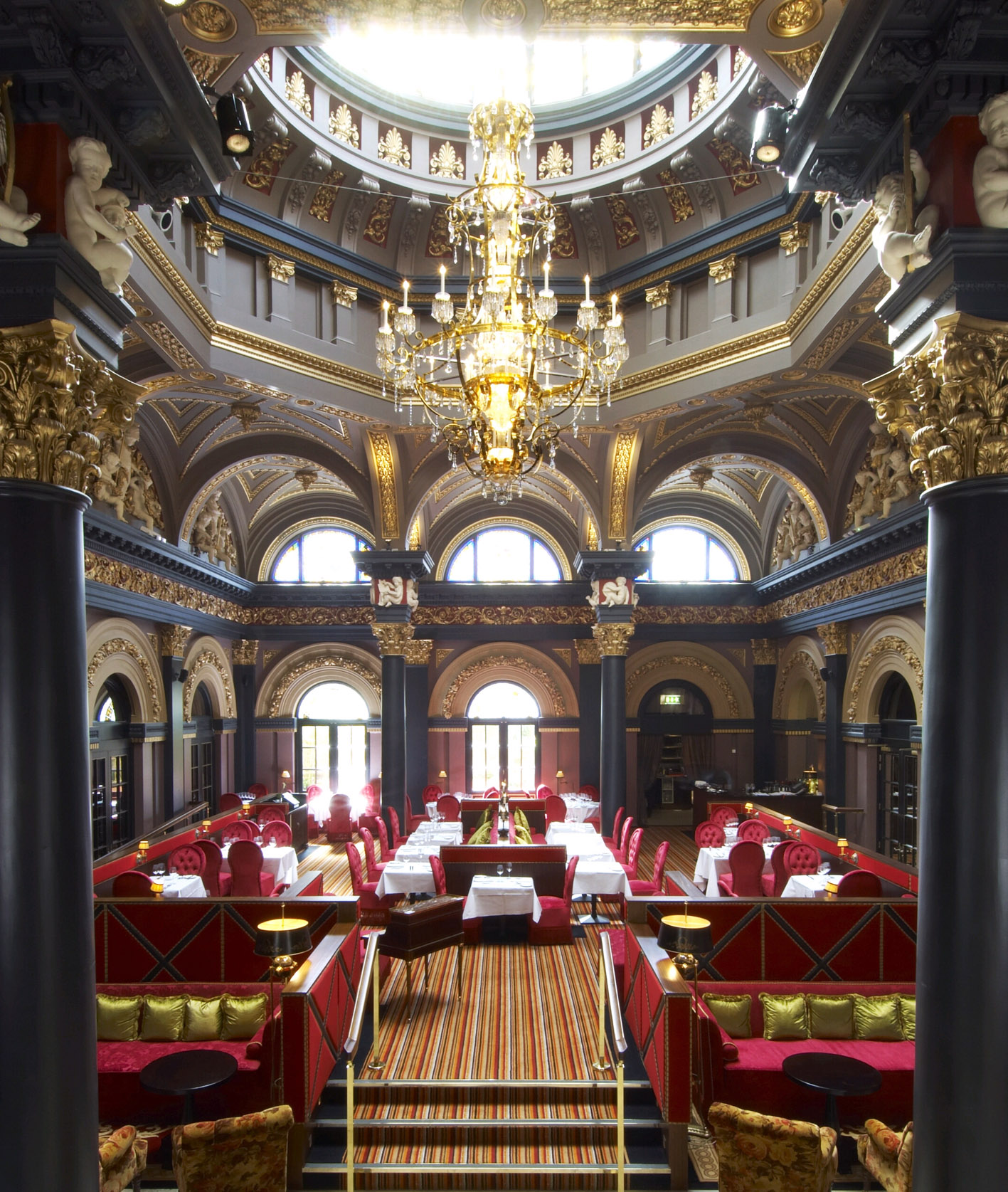
Ireland's largest crystal chandelier by Marcus Notley, in the Merchant Hotel, Belfast (2006)

In 2006 he completed the design of Ireland's largest crystal chandelier specially commissioned by the Merchant Hotel in Belfast. It was made by Tyrone Crystal. The chandelier is 4.5 metres in height. It is constructed with over 2600 pieces of crystal on a gilded gold metalwork frame, all of which is suspended from a glass dome above the hotel's Great Room restaurant.

In 2008 Notley was chosen by the National Museum of Ireland to represent the nation at the European Glass Context exhibition in Denmark.
