= Edinburgh Crystal =

Type of cut glass crystal manufactured in Scotland

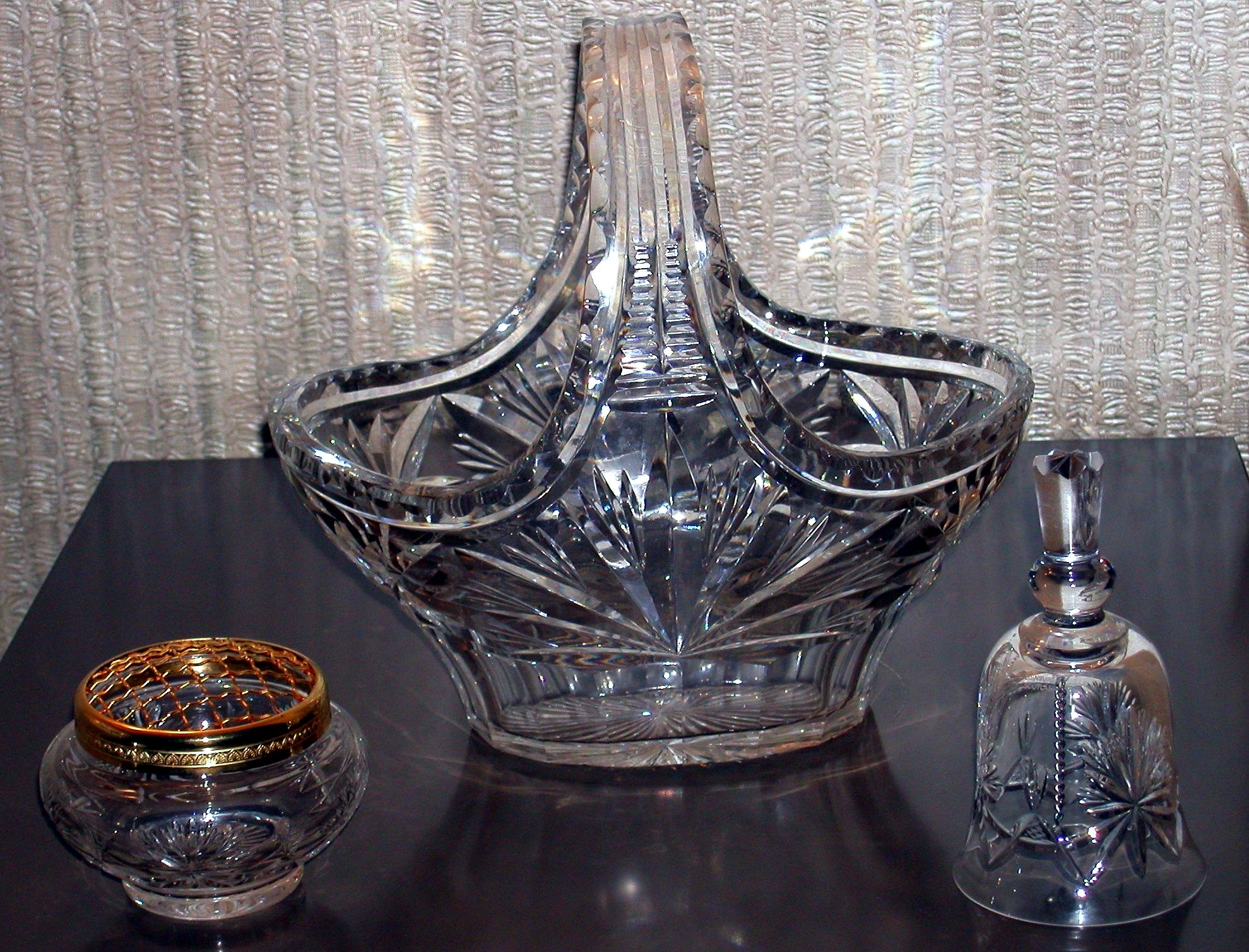
Star of Edinburgh bowl, basket and bell from about 1955

Edinburgh Crystal was a cut glass manufactured in Scotland from c. 1820s to 2006, and was also the name of the manufacturing company. In addition to drinking glasses, Edinburgh Crystal made decanters, bowls, baskets, and bells, in several ranges.

The Edinburgh Crystal company went into administration in 2006. In 2007 it was acquired by Waterford Wedgwood, and became solely a brand name. After Waterford Wedgwood was acquired from administration by KPS Capital Partners, in January 2009, the brand was discontinued.

== Ranges ==
There were many ranges of glassware but at the collectable end there were just four in the former 'Connoisseur Collection'.

- 'Star of Edinburgh' – decorated with a star-burst pattern.
- 'Thistle' – the tops of these pieces are shaped in accordance with the thistle theme while the body is stippled.
- 'King James' – glassware in this range is notable for the long stems and neck, and is loosely based on that in use in the 17th century.
- 'Lochnagar' – Lochnagar was introduced during the reign of Queen Victoria and can be identified by its swirling pattern.

== Collaboration by design ==
For several years students from Wolverhampton University and the Edinburgh College of Art were employed, for periods of 12–15 months, to work in the design department. This provided the students with work experience while inputting new design ideas. The 'Edge' range came out of this collaboration.

== Visitor centre ==
The visitor centre, now closed, was located at the Eastfield Industrial Estate in Penicuik, Midlothian. It hosted around 100,000 people each year, who could see how the glassware was made and speak with the master craftsmen.

== History ==
Glass container manufacturing can be traced back for at least 400 years. However, it was only in the 19th century that commercial companies appeared on the scene.

Amongst them, the Edinburgh and Leith Flint Glass Company was established. Although the founding date of the company is unknown, records indicate the company was operating under the name Edinburgh and Leith Glass Co., as early as 1829. Alexander Dixson Jenkinson took over the business upon the death of his father in 1880. Alexander Jenkinson died in 1909 and the business was inherited by Stanley Noel Jenkinson.

1921 saw Thomas Webb and Sons Limited of Stourbridge, West Midlands, buy Edinburgh Crystal which continued to trade under its own name.

1955 brought a name change from the Edinburgh and Leith Flint Glass Company to The Edinburgh Crystal Glass Company.

Further corporate activity took place in 1964 when Crown House Limited acquired The Edinburgh Crystal Glass Company and Thomas Webb and Sons.

During 1969, there was a move to a site of over 7 acres (28,000 m^{2}) in Penicuik, Midlothian some 10 miles (16 km) from Edinburgh.

Then in 1971 Edinburgh Crystal and Thomas Webb merged with Dema Glass, another Crown House subsidiary. Thomas Webb and Sons and The Edinburgh Crystal Glass Company traded well resulting in 1990 in being incorporated into the Coloroll Group.

After Coloroll went bankrupt in 1991, Caledonia Investments, with the support of senior managers, led a buy-out of the Edinburgh Crystal Glass Company and the Thomas Webb and Sons brand. The new company moved all manufacturing and distribution to its site in Penicuik.

In April 2004, Edinburgh Crystal bought Caithness Glass from the receivers Deloitte. Caithness Glass are notable for paperweights.

In May 2006 the offices and warehouse were badly damaged by fire.

On 26 July 2006 the Edinburgh Crystal Glass Company Ltd went into administration. Its two subsidiaries, the Caithness Glass Company Ltd and Selkirk Glass Ltd, continued to trade.

On 5 August 2006 Caithness Glass Company Ltd went into administration.

On 10 August 2006 Selkirk Glass Ltd went into administration. It ceased trading soon afterwards. The Caithness Glass arm of the business was purchased by Dartington Crystal and is still manufacturing paperweights in Scotland.

In 2007 Waterford Wedgwood bought the Edinburgh Crystal company. Edinburgh Crystal continued as a brand name only with all manufacturing moved to Europe. Then, in January 2009, Waterford Wedgwood went into administration and were bought by KPS Capital Partners. At this time the brand was discontinued.

== Notable products ==
The company produced the glass panels for the lamps on the royal carriages.

Caithness Glass produced the trophy presented to the winner of the BBC's Mastermind programme.

== See also ==
- Tyrone Crystal
- Waterford Crystal
