= Merchant Hotel (Belfast) =

Hotel in Belfast, Northern Ireland

Coordinates: 54.601°N 5.925°W

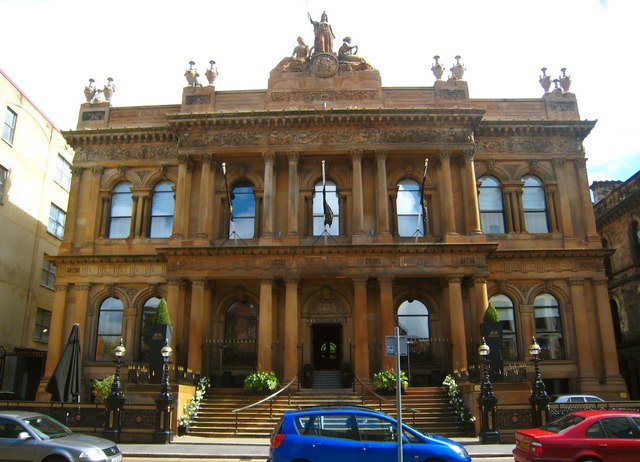
Merchant Hotel, former Ulster Bank headquarters (2010)

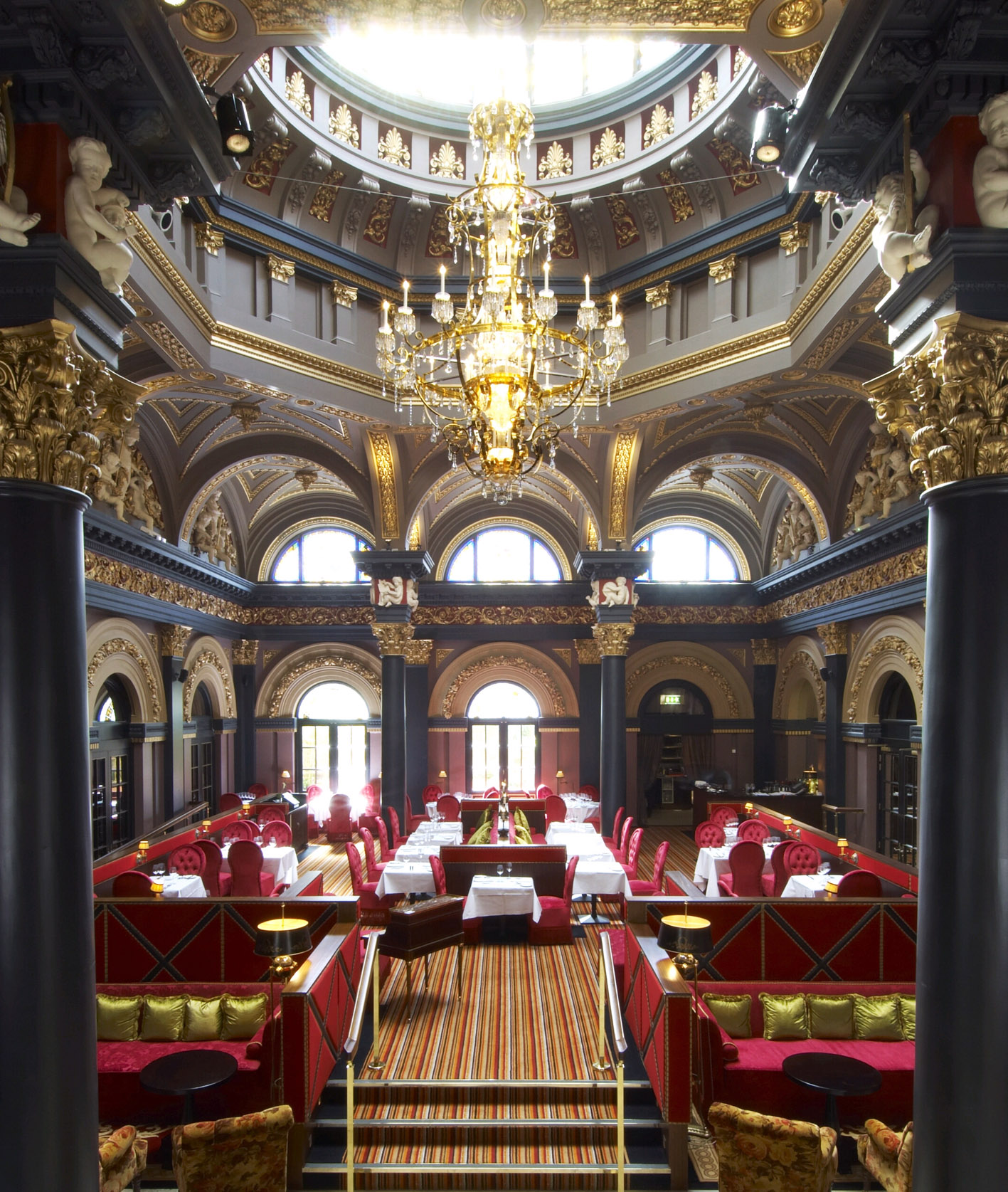
The largest chandelier in Ireland, made by Tyrone Crystal (2006)

The Merchant Hotel is a five-star luxury hotel in Belfast, Northern Ireland. The hotel is situated on Skipper Street. It is owned and operated by Bangor entrepreneur Bill Wolsley’s Beannchor Group.

== History ==
The building was built in the mid-nineteenth century as the headquarters of the Ulster Bank and was transformed into a hotel in 2006. The hotel was extended in 2010 with further refurbishments to the original building in 2020.

Tyrone Crystal built the chandelier for The Great Room Restaurant, the designer was Marcus Notley. It is made out of embellished gold on metal and 2600 blown-out crystal pieces. With 4.5m in height, 2.9m in diameter and a weight of 400 kg, it is the largest chandelier in Northern Ireland and the island of Ireland. The chandelier was installed in 2006.

In July 2009, Merchant Hotel won the "World's Best Hotel Bar" competition. In 2010, it was awarded World's Best Cocktail Bar at the Tales of the Cocktail awards.
