= Moss agate glass =

Rare type of art glass

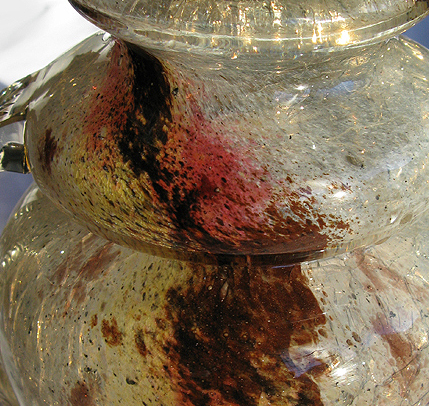
Detail from a "Moss Agate" vase by John Northwood, c.1888. The vase is in a private collection in New York City.

Moss Agate glass is a rare type of art glass developed in 1888 at the noted glasshouse Stevens & Williams by glassmaker John Northwood, with the assistance of Will Bridges, then manager of the firm. It was the most sophisticated type of a variety of glass often referred to as "stone glass." The concept of the "Moss Agate" glass was to closely approximate the look and weight of the mineral it was meant to imitate. Each piece was one-of-a-kind and was decorated with fine wheel cutting, and came in many different vase shapes.

"Sotheby's Glass Glossary" says about its manufacture: "A gather of soda glass was cased in lead glass, coated in powdered colored glass and again cased in lead glass, which was injected with water to cause the soda glass to crack. After the water was emptied out it was reheated to leave a crackled network."

== Sources ==
- Glover, Ray & Lee. Art Glass Nouveau, page 188 (plate 349).
- Glover, Ray & Lee. Carved & Decorated European Art Glass, page 78.
- Revi, Albert Christian. Nineteenth Century Glass, Its Genesis and Development, page 240.
