= Ajka Crystal =

Hungarian crystal manufacturer

Ajka Crystal is a Hungarian manufacturer of crystal created in 1878 by Bernard Neumann. The company, one of the biggest in Central Europe, produces unique, handmade pieces of glass art. Ajka Crystal also goes under the name of "The Romanov Collection" in the United States. Ajka Crystal exports 90% of the factory's total production – both in tableware (stemware, tumblers etc...) and in giftware (vases, bowls) – for brands such as Wedgwood, Tiffany's, Rosenthal, Waterford Crystal, Polo Ralph Lauren, Christian Dior, Moser and other high-end French crystal manufacturers.

Ajka Crystal is located in Ajka, Hungary.
