= Caithness Glass =

Scottish artistic glassware manufacturer

Caithness Glass is a Scottish artistic glassware manufacturing company. It was established in Wick, Caithness, Scotland in 1961 by Robin Sinclair, 2nd Viscount Thurso. It was rescued by George Mackie, Baron Mackie of Benshie in 1966. Mackie was chairman for the next two decades. Since 2006, the company has been based in Crieff, Perthshire. The company was created to help create additional employment in the face of continuing decline in local fishing and agriculture and also to take advantage of the easy availability of sand for glassmaking in Caithness. The local sand, however, proved unsuitable for manufacturing clear glass (as its high iron content would turn the glass green). The company soon specialised in the manufacture of glass paperweights, plus some ornamental glassware. The firm also became well known for supplying the annual trophy for the BBC Mastermind television quiz programme. The company was awarded a Royal Warrant by the Queen Mother in 1968.

Manufacturing was initially solely located in Wick, with a second facility being opened in Oban in 1969 and Perth in 1979. In 1981 Caithness Glass purchased the historic London firm James Powell and Sons, also known as Whitefriars Glass, but the London factory was closed. The company headquarters and paperweight manufacturing were based in Perth from 1995, eventually resulting in the closure of the original Wick base and thus severing the physical connection with Caithness.

Caithness Glass went into receivership in 2004. It was bought by the owners of Edinburgh Crystal, but again went into receivership in 2006. It was bought (out of receivership) in October 2006 by Dartington Crystal and continues to manufacture and sell glass paperweights. The factories in Wick, Oban and Perth all closed and were replaced by a smaller operation within the Crieff Visitor Centre.
