= Claus Josef Riedel =

Czech glassmaker, businessman and chemical engineer

Claus Josef Riedel (19 February 1925 – 17 March 2004) was a Czech (Born in Kořenov near Jablonec) glassmaker, businessman, professor of chemistry, and chemical engineer. He was the 9th-generation owner of Riedel Crystal, an Austrian glassware manufacturer that was established in 1756. Riedel is best known for creating and producing grape variety-specific glassware designed to enhance types of wines based on specific properties of individual grape varieties. He was among the first glassware experts in history to recognize that the taste of wine is affected by the shape of the glass from which it is consumed, and is credited with first discovering the concept of variety-specificity in glassware, developing variety-specific glassware shapes and bringing these glasses to the consumer market. Riedel served as president and chief executive officer of Riedel Crystal from 1957 until 1994.

== Biography ==
Claus Riedel was born in Polaun, now part of Kořenov, Bohemia (present-day Czech Republic), to Walter Riedel, a glassmaker, and Claudia Prollius Riedel. Claus Riedel was drafted by the German Army in World War II, where he fought Italian partisans in Tuscany and Liguria. In March 1945 he was captured by American forces and sent to a prisoner-of-war camp near Pisa, Italy for ten months. In January 1946, while being returned to Germany for repatriation, Riedel escaped by jumping from a train entering Austria.

Riedel remained in Austria, finding a job with glassmaker Daniel Swarovski, who had once been an apprentice to Riedel's great-grandfather Josef Riedel. He also enrolled in the University of Innsbruck in Tyrol, where he studied chemistry. After graduating, he spent five years working various jobs throughout Europe. In 1955 he was contacted by the Austrian People's Party Prime Minister, Reinhard Kamitz, who invited him to take over the bankrupt Tiroler Glashütte glassware factory.

== Restarting the Riedel company ==
Walter Riedel had been employed during World War II by the Germans to blow vacuum tubes for electronic equipment. In that capacity he had been captured by the conquering Russian army in 1945, and taken to the USSR as a prisoner of war. After ten years he was released, and found his way to Austria, where he joined Claus. With assistance from Swarovski, the two Riedels were able to reopen the glassware factory by 1957, turning it into today's Riedel Glass Factory in Kufstein, Austria. Prior to World War II, the factory had produced heavy industrial glass, but upon reopening, Claus Riedel changed its focus to fine hand-made glass. Claus Riedel served as president and chief executive officer of Riedel Crystal from 1957 until 1994, when he turned the reins over to his son Georg Josef Riedel, who later was succeeded by his son Maximilian Riedel, who is the current president and CEO of Riedel Crystal.

== Design innovations ==
As a glassmaker, Riedel was interested primarily in function over appearance, and broke away from the traditional richly cut, heavy and thick glass designs of the time. He spent 16 years studying the physics of wine delivery to the mouth and taste buds and experimenting with different glass configurations, matching them with wines of different regions, grape origin and age to create stemware that would match and complement specific wines and spirits. He was among the first glassware experts in history to recognize that the taste of wine is affected by the shape of the glass from which it is consumed.

From these experiments, Riedel created the Burgundy Grand Cru glass in 1958, made to enhance the flavors and aromas of the Pinot Noir and Nebbiolo grape variety, specifically for Burgundy, Barolo, and Barbaresco wines. This creation was first exhibited at the World Exhibition in Brussels, Expo 58 (The Brussels Worlds Fair), where it received a Gold Medal for its creative and striking design. It was acquired by the Museum of Modern Art in New York for the museum's permanent collection.

In 1961, Riedel Crystal introduced the first full line of wine glasses created for different wines. Riedel perfected these variety-specific wine glasses in 1973 with the introduction of his most notable glass collection, the Sommeliers Series, the world's first gourmet glasses.

== Awards and nominations ==
Claus Riedel was honored with 28 design prizes and awards for his creations. Notable honors include:

- 1958: World Exhibition, Expo 58, Brussels – Gold Medal
- 1958: Museum of Modern Art, Burgundy Grand Cru glass selected for permanent collection
- 1959: Sommeliers Series Burgundy Grand Cru glass awarded Most Beautiful Glass in the World, Corning Museum of Glass
- 1960: La Triennale di Milano, Silver Medal
- 1966: American Institute of Interior Designers Award

== Personal life ==
During his lifetime, Claus Riedel was married five times to four different women (he married Ute two separate times).

On 17 March 2004, Riedel died in Genoa, Italy from heart failure while visiting family. He was survived by his fourth wife Ute, by two children from previous marriages (Georg Riedel and Barbara Riedel Orehounig), and a son (Wenzel Riedel) by Ute Riedel.
