= Nachtmann (glass manufacturer) =

Makers of glassware

Nachtmann or F. X. Nachtmann Bleikristallwerke GmbH (English: F. X. Nachtmann Lead Crystal Works Ltd.) was a fine glass maker, founded in 1834 by Michael Nachtmann in Unterhütte, Oberpfalz. In 1900, the company was taken over by Zacharias Frank who moved the headquarters to Neustadt an der Waldnaab.

After the war in 1945 Nachtmann rebuilt the partially destroyed production facilities and began with the production of lead crystal in Neustadt and Riedlhütte. In 1983 a third, highly modern lead crystal plant was founded in Weiden in der Oberpfalz.

In 2004 the Nachtmann company was taken over by its rival, the Austrian crystal maker Riedel which now carries its name and brand. As of 2011 the website associated with its name is active and continues sale of fine glass under the Riedel umbrella.
