= Georg Josef Riedel =

Austrian glassmaker and businessman (born 1949)

Georg Josef Riedel (born December 16, 1949) is an Austrian glassmaker and businessman. He is the 10th-generation owner of Riedel (glass manufacturer) established in 1756 and best known for its production of grape variety-specific glassware designed to enhance types of wines based on specific properties of individual grape varieties. Georg Riedel joined the family business in 1973 as accountant, before rising to co-CEO of Riedel Crystal alongside his father, Claus Josef Riedel, from 1987 until 1994. He was chief executive officer from 1994 until 2013. Georg Riedel succeeded his father, who first developed the concept of wine-enhancing glassware in 1958, and is best known for bringing variety-specific wine glasses to a global audience.

== Early life ==
Georg Josef Riedel was born in 1949 in Innsbruck, Austria to Claus J Riedel and Adia Rosa Riedel (née Parodi).

== Career ==
In 1973, Georg Riedel joined his family's company as an accountant. In 1982, he expanded Riedel's product-development process, founding the Glass Workshop based at the company headquarters in Kufstein, Austria, with an increased focus on the development of new glassware shapes to enhance the flavors of alcoholic beverages on the palate Riedel History & Generations. In 1987 Riedel was named co-CEO of the company alongside his father Claus. In this role, Georg Riedel worked directly with industry experts and leading winemakers, including Robert Mondavi and Angelo Gaja, inviting them to taste their wines in Riedel glasses of different shapes and sizes to determine the glass that best expressed the flavors and aromas of their single variety wines. As a result, Riedel Crystal earned the endorsement of industry experts and influential winemakers, who insisted that their wines be served exclusively in Riedel glasses. To that end, in 1991, Robert M. Parker, Jr. who described Riedel glassware in The Wine Advocate, claimed: “The finest glasses for both technical and hedonistic purposes are those made by Riedel. The effect of these glasses on fine wine is profound.”

In 1994 Georg Riedel took over as sole Chief Executive Officer of Riedel Crystal. In 2013, Riedel stepped down as CEO and named his son, 11th-generation Maximilian Riedel, President and CEO of Riedel Crystal and its worldwide subsidiaries. Today, Riedel is managed jointly by Georg Riedel and Maximilian Riedel.

== Acquisition of Subsidiaries & Expansion ==
In 1979 Georg Riedel established Riedel Crystal of America in New York, United States of America. He continued the company's expansion, opening Riedel offices in the UK (1979), Canada (December 1991), Germany (1996), Japan (December 1999), Australia (July 2007), China (February 2010), New Zealand (November 2014) and France (July 2016).

In 1986 he introduced the first machine-made glass based on wine varieties in history – Vinum! With Vinum Riedel has been able to turn the philosophy of the functional wine glass developed by the company into something affordable and therefore also well-known around the world.

In 2004, Georg Riedel bought the German-based F.X. Nachtmann, which included both the Nachtmann decorative and wine glassware brand and the Spiegelau beer and wine glassware brand. The three brands (Riedel, Nachtmann, Spiegelau) operate under “Riedel Glass Works” as one of the largest producers of fine glass in Europe. Today Riedel has a 97% export rate.

== Design Innovation Timeline ==
- 1986: Developed the Vinum Series, the first variety-specific glassware made by machine. The Vinum Series expanded on the mouthblown Sommeliers Series, Riedel Crystal's first line of variety-specific glassware, and provided an affordable glassware alternative to a growing segment of wine-drinkers in the United States, which increased by 12% between 1980 and 1990.
- 1989: Developed the Ouverture Series, positioned as the entry level variety-specific glass for wine drinkers who appreciate good, reasonably priced wine.
- 2000: Developed the Vinum Extreme Series, Riedel's first collection of glasses designed specifically for New World wines.
- 2007: Developed Tyrol, Riedel's first variety-specific glassware line with a stout, solid base. The collection was created to celebrate the 50th anniversary of the Riedel family's Kufstein factory located in the Tirol province of Austria.
- 2011: Developed the Escargot decanter, whose shape was inspired by a snail and was designed to double-decant wine, a Riedel-developed technology that achieves hours of decanting in a matter of minutes.

== Awards and nominations ==
- 1996: Decanter (magazine), Decanter Man of the Year, nomination
- 2019: Distinguished Service Award, Wine Spectator
- 2021: Tableware International Award of Excellence Lifetime Achievement

== Personal life ==
An avid runner, Riedel began running at age 30 and has completed 10 marathons and undertakes mountain hiking expeditions. Riedel has been married for 41 years to his wife, Eva. They met during his time as a student in Vienna and got married in 1973. They have two children, son Maximilian J Riedel and daughter Laetizia Riedel-Rothlisberger, and 5 grandchildren.
