= Royal Brierley =

English cut glass company

Royal Brierley is a fine cut glass ("cut crystal" for marketing purposes) brand, owned by Dartington Crystal and based in North Devon. It is one of the oldest crystal glass brands in England.

Many of the creations became quality museum pieces. The trading name Stevens & Williams was used until the 1930s when the company became Royal Brierley Crystal to signify its royal warrant of appointment as glassmakers. The first royal warrant was awarded by King George V and the most recent by King Charles III.

== History ==
The history of the company goes back to 1776, when it was set up as an independent family business. Most involved in the history of the company were three families: de Henzel, Honeyborne and latterly, Silver.

Joseph Silver leased the Moor Lane Glasshouse at Brierley Hill. His daughters married William Stevens and Samuel Cox-Williams, who took control of the business in 1847. The company became subsequently known as the Stevens and Williams Glassworks.

Royal Brierley Crystal started production in 1776 and was one of the longest-running businesses in the Black Country.

The 10-acre factory in North Street, Brierley Hill was closed in 2002 and the business moved to Tipton Road. Royal Brierley were taken over by Dartington Crystal in 2005 and over time operations were relocated to North Devon.
