= Tipperary Crystal =

Irish design company

Tipperary Crystal is an Irish design company based in Dublin. Tipperary Crystal is an Irish crystal design and manufacturing company founded in 1987 by former Waterford Crystal-craftsmen In Ireland.

In 1996, there was a high court case about the shareholding in which three minority shareholders complained about their actual share holding.

Examples of the collection are in the collection of the Hunt Museum.

== See also ==
- Tyrone Crystal
