= Tyrone Crystal =

Former British crystal manufacturing company

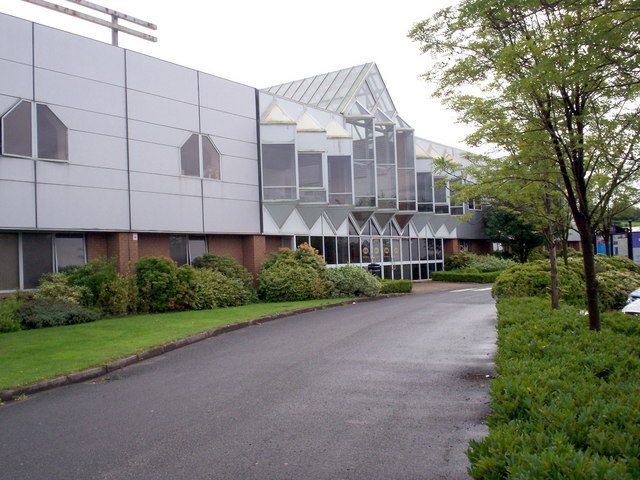
Tyrone Crystal building in Dungannon (2008)

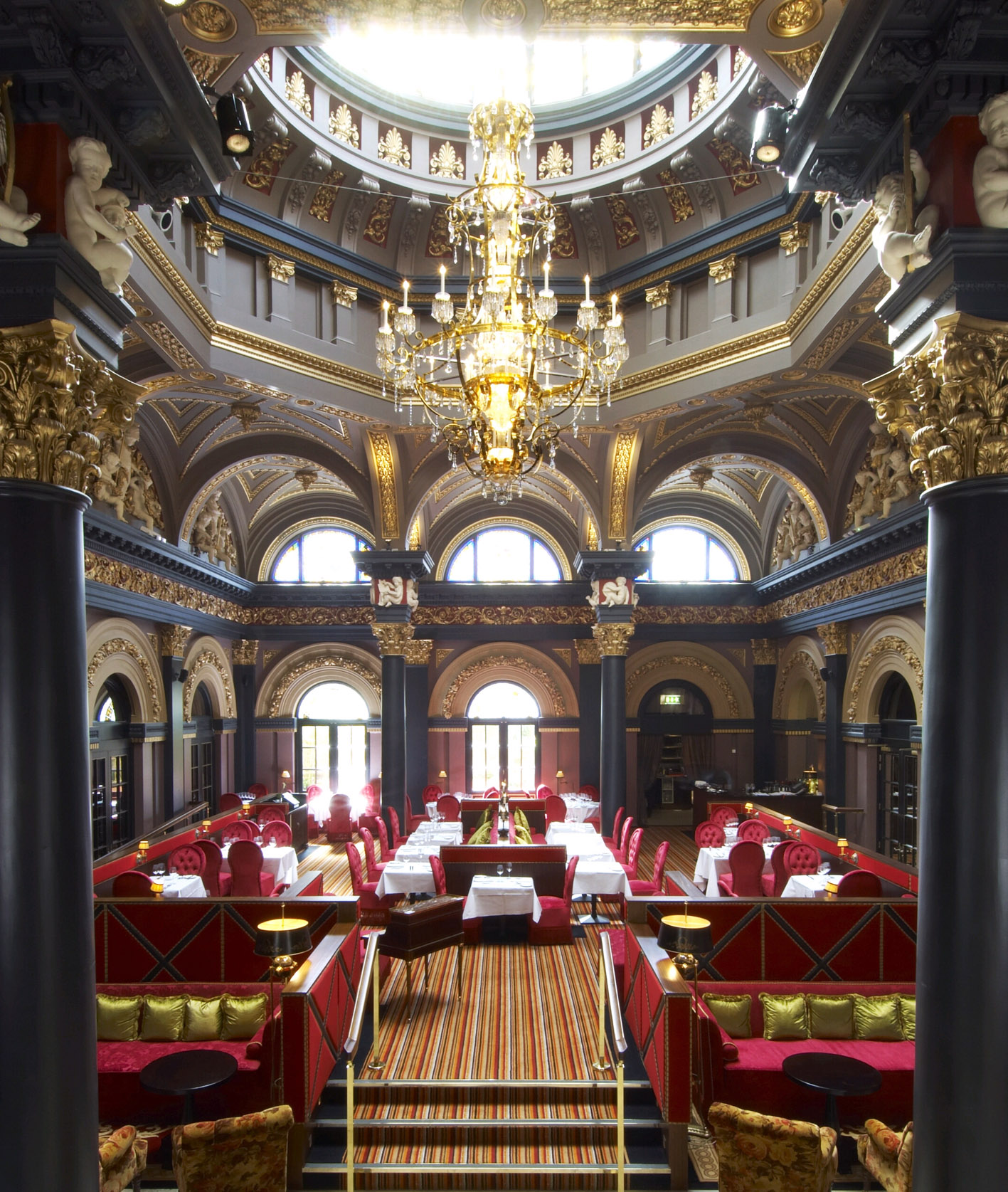
Chandelier by Tyrone in the Merchant Hotel, Belfast (2006)

Tyrone Crystal was a crystal manufacturing company in Dungannon, County Tyrone in Northern Ireland.

== History ==
Glass-making and -decoration in County Tyrone can be dated back to the early medieval period, where Dunmisk outside Carrickmore was a centre for manufacture and provides the first evidence of glass work in Europe Modern glass work dates to 1771, when Benjamin Edwards founded a company in County Tyrone, Ireland. Tyrone Crystal was set up two hundred years later in 1971, by Father Austin Eustace to create employment in the Dungannon area of County Tyrone. There was not a lot of employment in the area at the time, and nobody in the area knew anything about making crystal. An advertisement was placed in a national newspaper, seeking someone who could train people in the area. Two Austrians, a master blower and a master cutter, were hiking across England and read the advertisement; they came over to train the employees. Trainees began practising on glass jars and bottles until they became skilled enough to make crystal on their own, and they set up a glass-blowing shop in Dungannon.

In 1988 the company was awarded an ISO 9000 for quality; the youngest glasshouse in Ireland or the U.K. to gain the recognised standard. A new factory, built in 1990, is also a tourist attraction. Tyrone Crystal acquired Tipperary Crystal in 2000 as part of an investment plan that spent £500,000 on a new visitors' centre that opened in 2001. The company was acquired by businessmen Peter Maginnis and Nigel Blackburn in 2006.

From 2005, Tyrone Crystal manufactured the trophy for the Canadian Grand Prix.

Designer Marcus Notley was commissioned by Tyrone to design the chandelier for the Great Room in the Merchant Hotel in Belfast. It is made out of embellished gold on metal and 2600 blown out crystal pieces. With 4.5m in height, 2.9m in diameter and a weight of 400 kg, it is the largest chandelier in Ireland. The chandelier was installed in 2006.

The Dungannon factory closed on 12 March 2010, with the loss of 31 jobs.

== See also ==
- Waterford Crystal
