= Riedel (glass manufacturer) =

Austrian glassware manufacturer

Tiroler Glashütte GmbH

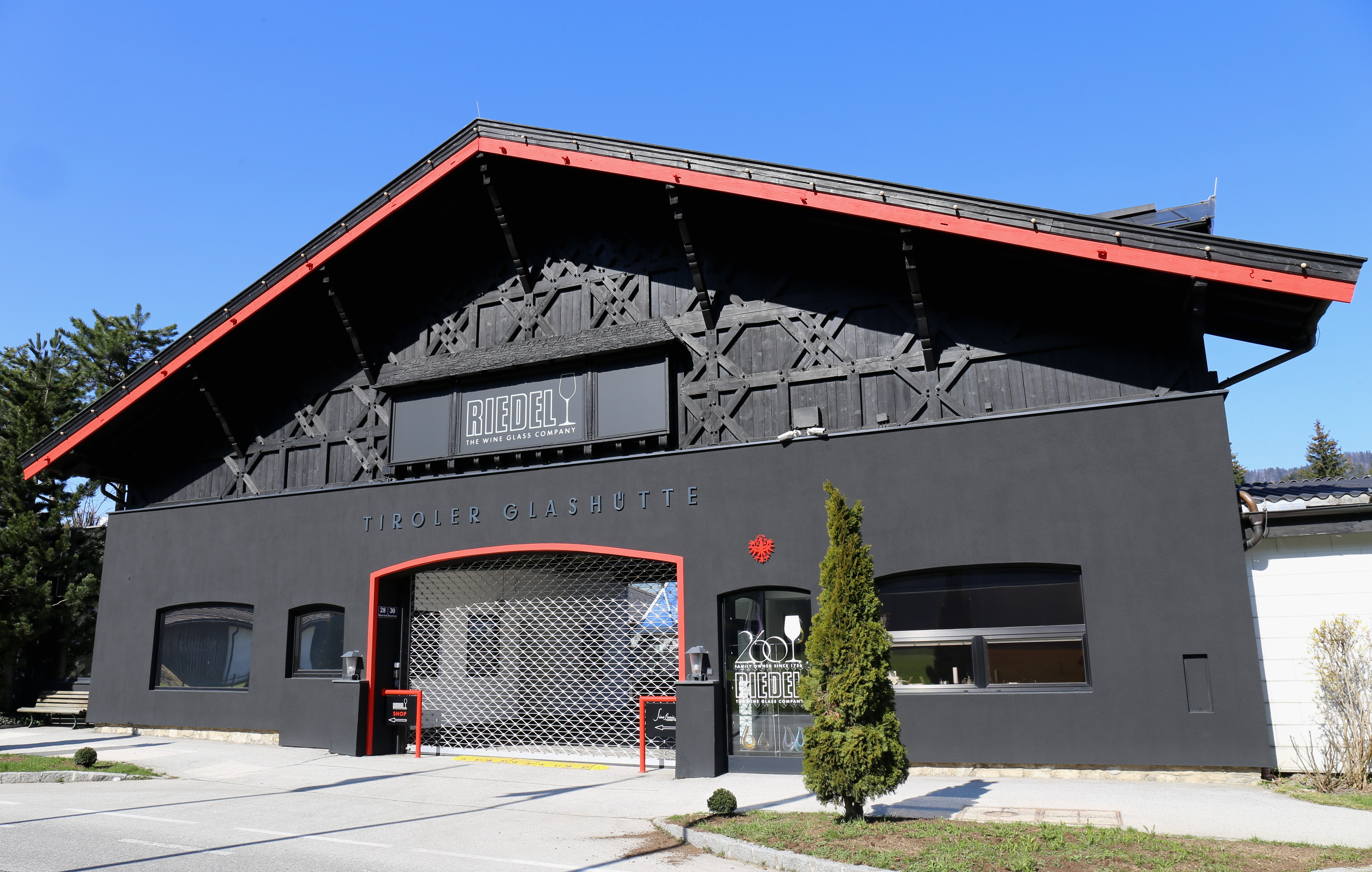
- Trade name: Riedel
- Type: Private (GmbH)
- Industry: Glass production
- Founded: 1756 (original); 1956 (current)
- Defunct: 1945 (original)
- Headquarters: Kufstein (Tyrol), Austria
- Key people: Maximilian Riedel (CEO)
- Products: Glassware
- Owner: Riedel family
- Website: www.riedel.com

Tiroler Glashütte GmbH, trading as Riedel (/ˈriːdəl/ REE-dəl), is an Austrian glassware manufacturer based in Kufstein, Austria. The company is best known for its glassware designed to enhance different types of wines. According to Petr Novy, chief curator of the Museum of Glass and Jewellery in Jablonec nad Nisou, Czech Republic, Riedel is the oldest family owned and operated global crystal glass brand worldwide.

The Riedel family originally founded a glassworks in 1756 in Bohemia, but the Riedels were dispossessed of their Bohemian factories and all other property in the aftermath of World War II. The family subsequently re-established itself by acquiring a glassworks in Kufstein in 1956 under the direction of Walter Riedel and his son, Claus. The company is currently managed by Georg Riedel and his son, Maximilian.

== History ==
=== Josef Riedel ===
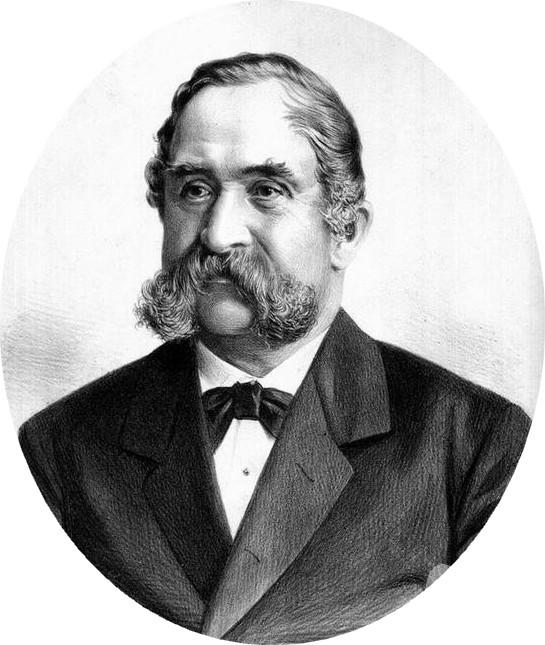
Josef Riedel (c. 1885)

Josef Riedel (1816–1894) was born in the time of the industrial revolution. He owned eight glassworks in 1858 to include two textile factories and coalmines. His glassworks produced glass jewellery, beads and chandelier parts and in 1873, they began producing luxury hollow glass products too. He received many accolades for his achievements: he was awarded the ‘Grand Prix’ at the World Fair in Vienna in 1873, honorary citizenship by local authorities in Franzesbad and Wiesenthal and he was awarded an Order by the Pope.

Through hard work and diligence, he was a contemporary model for success in business. His employees respectfully addressed him as ‘Mr. Father’ and his contemporaries referred to him as the ‘Glass King of the Iser Mountains’. Josef Riedel dedicated his life to building an empire with solid foundations. Instead of discounting prices, he offered only high-quality products, which customers appreciated. According to Walter Spiegl, an author who specialized in the topic of glass of the 19th century, Josef Riedel was the first to invent uranium glass. Josef Riedel named this glass type "Annagelb" and "Annagrün" after his wife Anna he married in 1840.

Additionally, Josef owned extensive land and was a well-known banker and financier in the mountains. His assistance included providing loans at 6% interest rate to businesses in need of capital, and even helping them find export markets financially. It was his financial support in 1861, for example, which allowed the company Gebrüder Feix in Albrechtsdorf to get started, which went on to become one of the largest manufacturers of buttons, black fashion jewellery and crystal wares in the land. It was in this company where Daniel Swarovski later began his career.

The Riedel company operated retail warehouses in all major manufacturing locations around Jablonec (Gablonz). The owners of these companies regularly informed the Riedels about current demand, competition, and big orders that exporters then forwarded to their suppliers for production. Josef Riedel was also respected as a glass expert in his own right. The industrial magnate Josef Schreiber, head of Viennese big glass company Josef Schreiber & Neffen, even called him the greatest expert on glassmaking in Bohemia.

Shortly after his death, Josef's sons registered the first Riedel logo in 1895.

=== The beginning: building a solid foundation ===
After Franz Riedel's (Fifth Generation, 1786–1844) death, his son-in-law Josef and daughter Marie Anna moved into the Manor House in Antoniwald and Josef took over the reins of the Klein Iser and Antoniwald Works. However, he did not own any share of his wife's businesses. In 1840, the glassworks in Antoniwald produced an annual 761 tons of clear and coloured glass, small bottles, chandelier trimmings and glass rods. Antoniwald also saw the birth of the couple's sons Hugo (1848–1883), Wilhelm (1849–1929) and Otto (1853–1901).

The Klein Iser Works were left in the capable hands of his kinsman Karl Kittel. Kittel retired in 1853 and was replaced by Johann Bengler, a bookkeeper from Christiansthal, who headed up the works for nearly forty years. Bengler invented a number of coloured glass types including jet black, lily yellow, antimony ruby, marble-like variations, and the Venetian aventurine. He was awarded the Empire's Golden Service Cross as a tribute to his glassmaking skills. In the early 1850s two long ‘pulling rooms’ were added to the glassworks. These were used to stretch glass to make tubes for the six faceted cut and polished seed beads then in demand.

On 6 March 1849, Josef Riedel bought a new glassworks, with his own money, from Ignaz Friedrich, a textile entrepreneur and glass trader. The new glassworks was based in Polaun near Klein Iser and had a wood-burning furnace. It was perfectly located: in 1847, a main road was laid through the Giant Mountains between Reichenberg, Gablonz and Trautenau. This road finally created a connection between Iser and the Giant Mountains with a central Bohemian road network. Under Josef's contract, Friedrich was unable to build a new glass factory for ten years; he agreed to purchase glass solely from Josef; and gave Josef the first right of refusal on any eventual sale of lands in the vicinity of the foundry.

After five years, Josef Riedel wanted to update the newly acquired glassworks in Polaun to meet expectations of modern jewellery component production facilities. He rebuilt in 1854–1856 and added a second furnace and ‘pulling’ facility in 1858. In 1855 his wife Marie-Anna died at the early age of thirty five, leaving Josef as the sole heir. The widowed Josef Riedel and his children remained in Antoniwald until the lease to the works ran out. Only in 1858 did he move his family to Polaun, where he settled in House Number 358, which still stands. This house also formerly belonged to Ignaz Friedrich. For seven years Josef Riedel had been travelling from Antoniwald to Polaun at least three times a week to oversee the rebuilding and later to run the glassworks. He paid the craftsmen, suppliers and glassmakers with his own funds during each trip. In the next decade, the craft of glassmaking turned into an industry and the impoverished region became home to a widely known commodity.

In 1859 Josef Riedel married Johanna Neuwinger (1836–1920), the daughter of the Clam-Gallas's chief forester from Ruppersdorf (near Reichenberg). It was an advantageous marriage, since Josef's Glassworks were located on the count's lands and he sourced his timber for Polaun from the Count's forests.

=== Expansion ===
At the beginning of the century the Iser Mountains had also become an important hub for the Bohemian textile industry with the mills ranking among the largest in the Empire. Josef wanted to be involved in textiles: in 1858, he began to build a modern cotton mill on the main Giant Mountain road at Grünthal on the Iser River. The mill was fully operational in 1862 and continued to expand as business was good; 5,000 spindles of cotton were produced here annually. In 1868 the mill was rebuilt again and production doubled to 10,000 spindles per annum. Some of the equipment came from a mill in Polaun, which Josef Riedel had bought at auction in the previous year from none other than Ignaz Friedrich.

On 1 September 1863, Josef registered his company under the name of ‘Josef Riedel’ at the Regional Court of Reichenberg. A lot of people disagreed about this, however it was "for the best".

The second half of the 1860s saw the biggest boom in the history of Gablonz glass bead jewellery. The capacity of local glassworks became inadequate and it was time for investment. Josef Riedel who was fully self-sufficient understood the need to invest. In 1865, he added a second and third furnace to his glassworks in Klein Iser. In 1866, he built a completely modern glassworks in stone, with two furnaces. In 1867 Josef established another works with two furnaces in Grünthal. The Grünthal works specialised in the production of chandelier trimmings and glass jeweler rods.

In 1868 and 1869, Josef modernized the furnaces at the Nowise and Polaun glassworks – they were no longer heated by wood and switched to wood gas. Josef was the first to incorporate the groundbreaking regenerative flue gas heat recovery system (first using wood, later using coal) to heat his glass furnaces. This new technology was invented by German engineer Friedrich Siemens between 1856 and 1861 and translated into a saving of 30-50%. In 1878, a competitive (but similar) system from Siebert (patented in 1878) was incorporated in Riedel's factories.

Production primarily consisted of jewellery and small glassware. These were purchased in the 1860s and 70s by the large Gablonz trading companies: Josef Pfeiffer, Eduard Dressler and Wilhelm Klaar, as well as smaller businesses in the Iser Mountains. Josef supplied blown hollow glass, small bottles and chandelier trimmings to Steinschönau and Haida in the Böhmisch Leipa region, with key customers including the well-known Steinschönau chandelier factory owned by Elias Palme. Steinschönau and Haida were known as the home of chandelier-making. However, the chandelier components came primarily from the Riedel Glassworks in the Iser Mountains. Josef donated a huge chandelier to the Franciscan church in Haindorf in 1853; it had been assembled in Steinschönau by Josef Helzel & Co. but its parts came from the Josef Riedel glassworks. This was true for similar gifts until Josef established his own factory in Polaun, which could assemble chandeliers. Before that the Polaun glass factory mainly supplied its hollow glass jewellery and small glass goods to customers in London, Vienna, Berlin, Constantinople, Paris and Amsterdam.

=== Overcoming the global crisis: investment ===
The 1870s was defined by the first global economic crisis. Dreams of endless economic growth suddenly ended and were replaced by an unprecedented, deep depression. Josef rode the storm and even expanded his empire thanks to a solid business foundation. He survived the crisis by making successful investments.

Josef Riedel understood that one of the foundations of successful industrial management was inexpensive energy. He therefore decided to opt for the newly available coal gas to heat his furnaces. On 23 February 1870, he bought mining rights in Hostomitz (in the Teplitz region) and set up mines on the land between 1874 and 1875. On 29 September 1876, Josef also purchased the nearby coalmines from the Saxo-Austrian Brown Coal Mining Company.

Josef built a branch line from the nearby station in Tannwald in order to easily transport the coal from Hostomitz to his works in Polaun. The railway line was completed in 1874 and ran from Tannwald to Eisenbrod (which in turn was connected to the main Bohemian railway network). However, the quality of coal that arrived was disappointing – as such, the main customers for the Hostomitz mines weren't the Riedel factories at all, but a chemical factory in Aussig and several others in Saxony, for which coal was delivered down the Elbe river.

Josef Riedel's fondness for spas and modern medical treatments did not go unsatisfied. In 1870 he bought a spa in Wurzelsdorf and installed peat bath treatments. The spa, under the management of the Bad Wurzelsdorf mills, opened its doors in 1872 and cared for patients with rheumatism, neuralgia, and anaemia.

Regardless of these other business ventures, Josef Riedel continued to focus primarily on glass. In 1871 a third furnace was installed in Polaun and the lands surrounding the glassworks changed hands from the Clam-Gallas family to the Riedels. That same year Josef handed over the management of Poland to his eldest son Hugo Riedel (1848–1883).

Walter Riedel (1895–1974), now in the eighth generation, continued to expand the company and manufactured glass jewelry and crystal, embroidery beads, lamps, technical glass and high-quality glassware. Its products received many awards in the interwar period. During the Second World War he manufactured picture tubes for radar applications and was therefore held in Soviet captivity after the war until 1955 and expropriated in communist Czechoslovakia. The family started again in 1957 with a business in Kufstein.

== Family ==
=== Hugo Riedel (1848–1883) ===
On 1 May 1873, Hugo switched production on one of the furnaces to decorated hollow glass as the demand for glass jewellery was declining while the demand for decorated glass was increasing internationally. Josef had never decorated his glassware in his factories himself before, choosing to concentrate on the base products, including hollow glass, which he would send to be decorated elsewhere – or simply let his customers do it. From that moment on, in 1873, Riedel began to produce luxury glass items. This initial move into glass decoration was not without difficulties but success came relatively quickly.

In 1873 the Riedels participated in the World Exhibition in Vienna, where they won a gold medal for their wares, including the all-new hollow decorative glass. This was their first award at a prestigious and internationally famous event. The new hollow glass was sold through Riedel's own distributors abroad, directly to foreign partners in Germany, Great Britain and France and to domestic merchants from Böhmisch Leipa region and Vienna.

Soon after 1873, Hugo installed a chemical lab and a two-pot experimental kiln in Polaun. It was here that new coloured glass and other technological innovations were created and patented. Hugo initiated the production of ruby glass coloured with Dukat Gold, added fine turbid and wound cones used to layer glass, invented Rozalin, came up with new processes to decorating glass with enamel and even designed some of the decorative glass. In 1876, the Polaun glassworks completely switched to coal in its kilns.

=== Wilhelm Riedel (1849–1929) ===
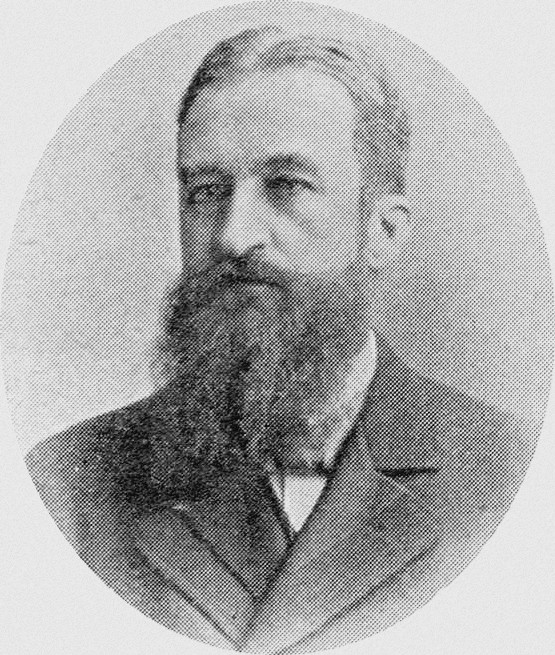
Wilhelm Riedel (c. 1910)

In the first half of the 1870s Josef Riedel brought his two sons Wilhelm and Otto into the business. Josef put Wilhelm Riedel (1849–1929) at the helm of the flax mill in Untermaxdorf and the Hostomitz coal mines. In 1874 Otto Riedel (1853–1901) became the director of the Grünthal mill.

In 1877, when Josef turned 61, he took the decision to transform his company into a family business, and so, on 17 February his sons Hugo, Wilhelm and Otto became shareholders in the company ‘Jos. Riedel’. From that point onward, all four took decisions relative to the future interests of the company. They held meetings every Thursday in Polaun where they evaluated past developments and made plans for what came next.

In 1878 Wilhelm Riedel switched the Maxdorf mill from processing flax to hemp. That same year, Jos. Riedel built a new glassworks next door which started production on 6 January 1879. Wilhelm Riedel drew up the plans for what was to be the most modern glass foundry in the region. The design of the building had a distinctly English allure, no doubt due to the six months the young businessman spent in Britain as a volunteer apprentice in the late 1860s.

In 1870s the Iser Mountains became known all over the world for the production of perfume bottles, cruets for salt, pepper, oil and other spices. Wilhelm Riedel invented and patented the technology of “using compressed air to shape hollow glass in metal moulds”. This outstanding innovation was responsible for the rapid exceeding success of the company. The decorative element was applied through machine-blowing that imitated cutting elements. The company where this new technology (patented on 23 September 1879) was executed was the foundry in Untermaxdorf.

On 13 December 1879 the Polaun company bought the Neudorf glassworks near Gablonz, expanded and adapted its furnace to use coal gas rather than a wood-burning kiln. In 1879, the Polaun company operated 11 wood gas or coal gas furnaces and a total of 76 pots in the Iser Mountains. In 1880, the six works in Polaun, Wurzelsdorf, Neudorf, Maxdorf and Klein Iser melted over 5,000 tons of glass. Jewellery accounted for the largest amount (2,100 tons), followed by perfume bottles (2,000 tons) and hollow glass (900 tons). In 1881, Wilhelm Riedel designed a glassworks in Stefansruh, close to Polaun. For this project the Riedel family decided to fully utilise the railroad tracks they had built five years previously to transport the coal required to heat the glass furnaces. The factories in Wurzeldorf and Neudorf were closed, the glassmakers were transferred to the new built Stefansruh. In 1882 the two coal gas-burning furnaces in Stefansruh began to produce glass rods.

In 1883, the family was devastated by the sudden death of Hugo Riedel, eldest son of Josef Riedel and director of the family glass empire. The first repercussion of Hugo Riedel's death was that construction of textile dyeing factory was stopped. Wilhelm Riedel at the age of 34 became director of the Riedel companies and moved to the headquarters in Polaun.

=== Otto Riedel, the glass king (1853–1901) ===
After the death of his brother Hugo, the management of the Wurzelsdorf textile mill which had 30,000 spindles, fell on Otto Riedel (3rd son of Josef and Anna).

=== Josef Riedel Jr. (1862–1924, seventh generation) ===
Josef Riedel Jr. was the last to join the firm and became a shareholder in 1886. Josef Jr. gained his technical chemical education at the Mochmann Institute in Dresden and l'École Municipale de Chimie Industrielle in Mühlhausen where he studied for four terms in 1881–82, he was perfectly prepared for the new role he was about to embrace.

In 1883, Jos. Riedel built a foundry for the production of bronzes where the Riedels began to manufacture for their own use metal-pressing moulds, tools, machines as well as functional and decorative appliances for glassware, and numerous other items. They began to develop metal moulds for their private label customers, glass decorators and merchants. Josef Riedel Jr. was put in charge to manage this operation, supported by Hermann Kittel, a famous girdler and metal-plater, as Technical Head of Operations.

In 1884 decorative bronze was replaced with plated zinc, which could imitate bronze as a decoration. The interest and demand for metal-cast and metal-encased glass grew with products sold globally due to the trading relations of the Riedel's customers.

=== Lighthouse customers ===
Josef Riedel was an early adopter of new technology. When Alexander Graham Bell invented the telephone in 1876, the Riedels implemented a private phone line in the forests to improve communication amongst their factories in 1883. When Thomas Alva Edison patented the first electric light bulb in 1881, the Riedels introduced electric light to the Riedel factories in 1883, primarily for safety reasons to limit fire risk. The modern era of lighthouses began at the turn of the 18th century and lighthouse construction boomed. The first Fresnel lens was used in 1823 - its light could be seen from more than 20 miles (32 km) out. In 1883, the Riedel production catalogues introduced moulded optical crystal Fresnel lenses for lighthouses, and speciality glass products began to play a significant role in the Jos. Riedel product mix. These were successfully exported until 1914 when World War I started.

== Competition ==
In 1870, Josef Schmiedel's Hundorf glassworks began making glass for beads - they were fierce competitors for Riedel offering them to the market for less. Instead of reducing the price, Josef Riedel, would buy out competitors. On December 22, 1883, the Riedel company bought Hundorf glassworks and it was the first time the Riedel ‘Glass Empire’ expanded beyond the Iser Mountains.

== Mechanisation, innovation, and focus ==
The Klein Iser glassworks, built by Franz Riedel in 1828, was closed in 1884 as it was the last non-industrial glass manufacturer whose operation had become prohibitively expensive.

Riedel diversified in 1885 into coal mining in the region of Hostomitz, 150 km west from the factory – the coal was not used for glass manufacturing but sold for other use. In the same year the Riedels widened their hemp manufacturing by acquiring a rope- and cable-making factory. It sold its finished goods through wholesalers to the world market. Expansion continued in 1886 with an additional glass factory in Stefansruh. The new factory was dedicated to glass rods and tubes, which replaced the production of the shut down Klein Iser factory. In 1886 the central administrative office was established in Polaun, which became the Jos. Riedel company headquarters.

However, in the same year, Venetian glassmakers developed a special machine to machine-cut and polish seed beads into perfect tiny donuts. The Bohemian bead production became instantly out-dated and could no longer compete. Josef Riedel Jr. travelled to Venice and recruited three Italian technicians. Their names were Tocellan, Morichetto and Giordani. With the input of Wilhelm and Josef junior, the three Venetian engineers improved and developed the original Venetian cutting machine in the Riedel bronze foundry. It was able to produce 3.000 tons of machine-cut seed beads per year.

At the same time, glass manufacturer Ludwig Breit introduced his glass-cut-off-machine. Mechanisation in the Iser Mountains led to significant unemployment. This led to the homeworkers' uprising at the beginning 1890 which culminated in the Wiesenthal Rebellion where workers died in a clash with police. The local government declared a state of emergency. The labour disturbances became so serious that the governor, Count Franz von Thun, visited the Iser region in person. The Riedel family, on the other hand, helped to ease the crisis and supported the unemployed homeworkers with financial grants.

Riedel expanded and purchased the world-class glass decorator ‘Vincenz Pohl in Neuwelt’ which opened additional business opportunities to the luxury glass market. The decorated glass produced in this workshop with colourful enamels became extremely popular in Venice, the French market as well as overseas in South America. The demand for luxury glass surpassed supply which made it necessary to open an additional decoration workshop at the Polaun plant. The Polaun plant became increasingly important for business because of its packaging department, paint shop, kilns for firing painted glass, and last but not least a showroom for customers. In 1887, Wilhelm Riedel invented a patented process to machine colour a scalloped edge instead of using hand paint. That same year, the company displayed its first-ever luxury glassware at the prestigious Leipzig Fair.

=== Year 1888 ===
The company was greatly honoured in 1888, when it was invited to be one of only seven glass factories in the Austro-Hungarian Empire to participate in the Exhibition of the Emperor's 40th Jubilee in Vienna. The Riedels were awarded medals for their lavishly decorated glass and seed beads. On September 26, 1888, the Emperor bestowed the Knight's Cross of the Order of Emperor Franz Joseph I on Josef Riedel.

At the exhibition, the Viennese specialist journal Centrallblatt focused on Joseph Riedel's coloured glass, which often appeared with decorative metal details. The magazine called the Riedel designs "truly special works of art".

Not every department of the business was prospering. Riedel's coal mining was closed that year.

=== Year 1889 ===
At the age of 27, Josef Jr. visited the World Exhibition in Paris (where Gustave Eiffel inaugurated the tower). At the exhibition he noticed that all the electric lamps on display featured only metal shades. He immediately seized the opportunity. The first glass lampshades to come out of the Riedel factories were shaped like bowls and flowers, and they instantly became an important part of the company's repertory.

=== Final years ===
On 24 April 1894, Josef died in his villa in Polaun after a short illness. He left behind six working glassworks, two glass finishing and decorating factories, a glass bead factory, a bronze foundry, and two textile mills.

In 1894, the group of companies represented half of the state's entire revenue from the Polaun region and employed 1,250 people (350 in the glassworks, 900 in the textile plants).

Josef Riedel was named Glass King of the Iser Mountains and in 1888, he was decorated with the papal Order of Pro Ecclesia et Pontifice. He was an honorary citizen of Wiesenthal an der Neisse as he had given the village land on which to build a church in 1880, and was an honorary citizen of Franzensbad (1858). He was also a member of the Reichenberg Chamber of Commerce, a member of the Committee of the District Office in Tannwald, an honorary curator of the Museum of Northern Bohemia in Reichenberg: the oldest institution celebrating industrial arts in the Czech Republic today and an honorary member of the sixteen other associations in the Iser Mountains and beyond.

In 1889, Josef requested architect Adolf Burger to build his funeral chapel. The chapel is located and can still be viewed today on the ridge above the Polaun and Stefansruh glassworks. The impressive Neo-gothic structure is in full view of the main road. Made of Muchdorf granite and the Horitz sandstone, it was completed in 1890. After consecration of the tomb, the first family members were buried: Josef Riedel Sr. (father of Josef), Marie Anna (+1855), the first wife of Josef, their first born son Hugo (+1883), and Franz Riedel (5th generation, +1844).

Josef Riedel's funeral took place three days after his death. Glassmakers carried the cask from his villa on their shoulders and company clerks lay him in his tomb. Josef's contemporaries remembered him for his efficiency, piety and benevolence. He valued his employees, and was also compassionate towards the poor and the sick. Furthermore, based on his wishes, a pension fund was set up for the company's staff and glassmakers on the day he died. His sons also decided – for the first time in the company's history – to grant power of attorney to three accountants. This was entered into the Commercial Register on 8 May. After his death, Josef's widow Johanna moved to Reichenberg, where she lived up until her own death in 1920 at the age of 84.

== Television and film appearances ==
Riedel glasses appeared in Gossip Girl's “The Townie” episode (Season 4, Episode 11), in a scene where Blair explains to Dan that one must wash Riedel glasses with L'Occitane shampoo.

Maximilian Riedel appeared in Season 1, Episode 11 of PBS’ Vine Talk, "Scrutinizing Shiraz From Australia".

== Criticism ==
In 2004, Gourmet magazine reported that "Studies at major research centers in Europe and the U.S. suggest that Riedel’s claims are, scientifically, nonsense." The article cites further evidence from Yale researcher Linda Bartoshuk, saying that the "tongue map" claimed by Riedel as an important part of their research, does not exist. According to Bartoshuk, “Your brain doesn’t care where taste is coming from in your mouth... And researchers have known this for thirty years.”

== See also ==
- Aroma of wine
- Nachtmann (glass manufacturer)
