= Dartington Crystal =

British glassware manufacturer

Dartington Crystal Ltd
- Type: Limited company
- Founded: Dartington Hall Trust
- Headquarters: Torrington, England
- Number of employees: 150
- Website: www.dartington.co.uk

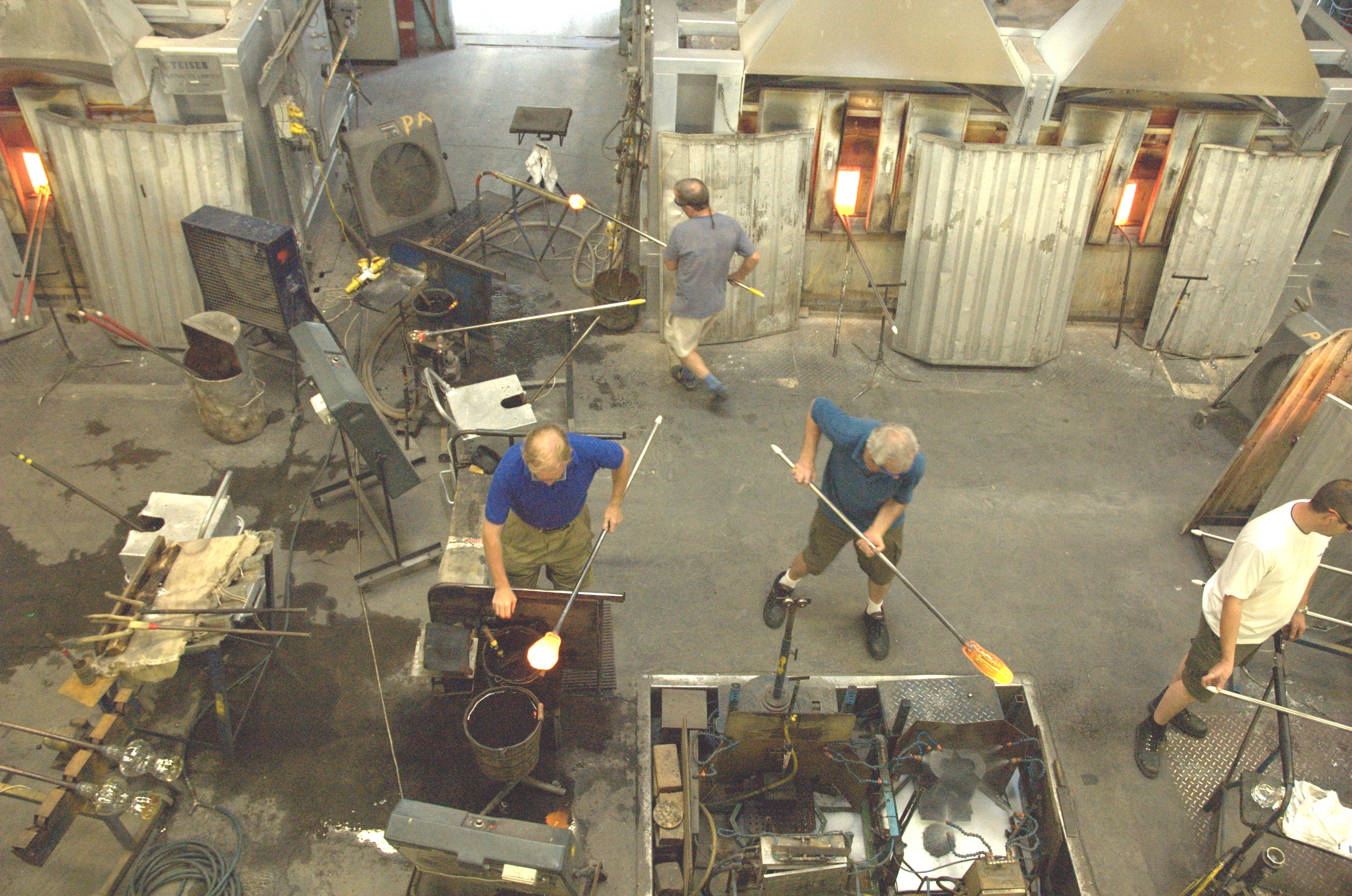
Glass blowers at Dartington Crystal

Dartington Crystal is a British manufacturer of crystal glassware, based in the town of Torrington in North Devon, England. The company manufactures glassware using traditional glass blowing techniques.

Many of their ranges continue to be made in their North Devon factory and Dartington Crystal is now one of only a few crystal brands still producing in the UK.

== History ==
The company was founded by the Dartington Hall Trust, a charity that then aimed to assist the economic regeneration of rural areas through business, education and the arts.

In the early 1960s, the trust became concerned that North Devon was becoming depopulated as a lack of job opportunities forced people to move elsewhere to find work. The glass-making factory was intended to be a solution to the problem, conceived as a centre of employment giving local people a reason to stay in the area.

On the recommendation of Frank Thrower, a ceramic salesman and self-taught glassware designer, the trust recruited Eskil Vilhemson, a Swedish glass manufacturer, to be the company's managing director. A team of Scandinavian glass blowers came with him to Torrington, most of whom stayed for many years. The factory opened in June 1967 under the name of Dartington Glass. A year later, in 1969, more glass blowers followed, one Italian and a couple from Denmark.

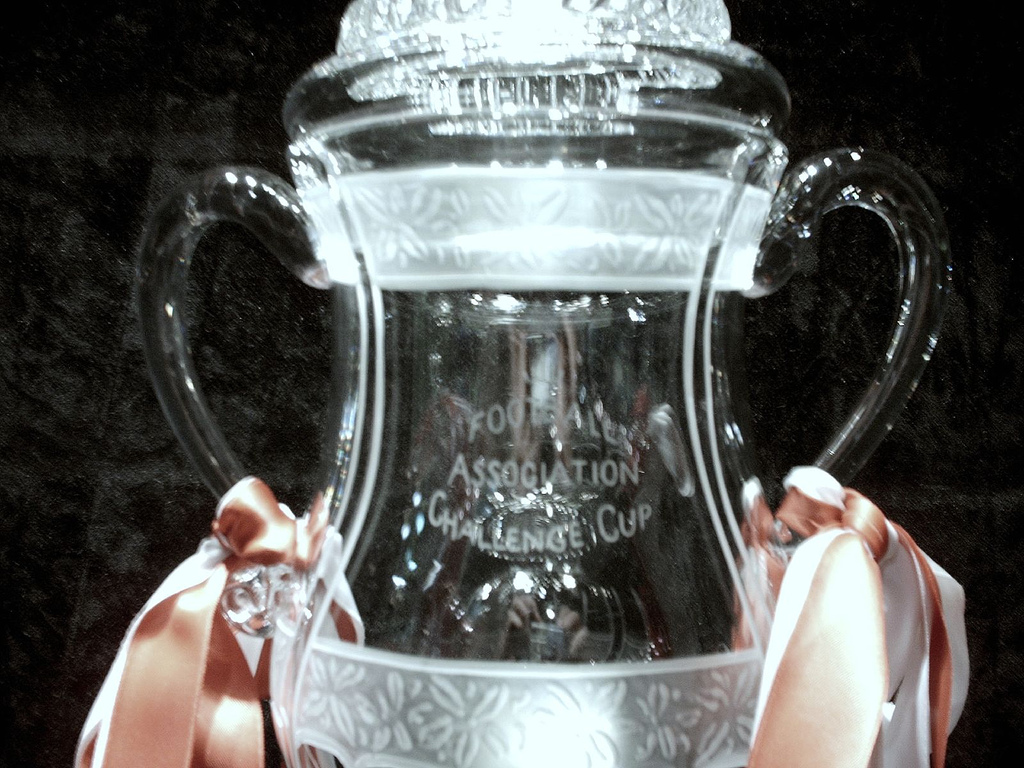
A 46cm-high replica FA Cup at Dartington Crystal

Demand outstripped production in the 1970s and the factory had to be expanded. By the 1980s the modern image of Dartington had attracted the attention of Wedgwood who took up a large stake in the business in 1982, allowing for further expansion.

In 1987, Frank Thrower MBE died of cancer, but the business still boomed in the late 1980s and early 1990s. In 1989 The Dartington Hall Trust sold a controlling interest to the Rockware Group, whose investment in the business allowed a modern batch mixing plant and new retail shop to be built. The business underwent a management buyout in 1994 from BTR, which had previously acquired the Rockware Group, and The Dartington Hall Trust sold their remaining stake in the business. The business was later acquired by US giftware giant Enesco in 2004, following the company briefly going into administration.

Dartington Crystal underwent another management buyout in April 2006, safeguarding many skilled jobs in the area. Dartington Crystal bought Scottish-based Caithness Glass out of receivership in October 2006 and also owns Royal Brierley Crystal which was based in the West Midlands.

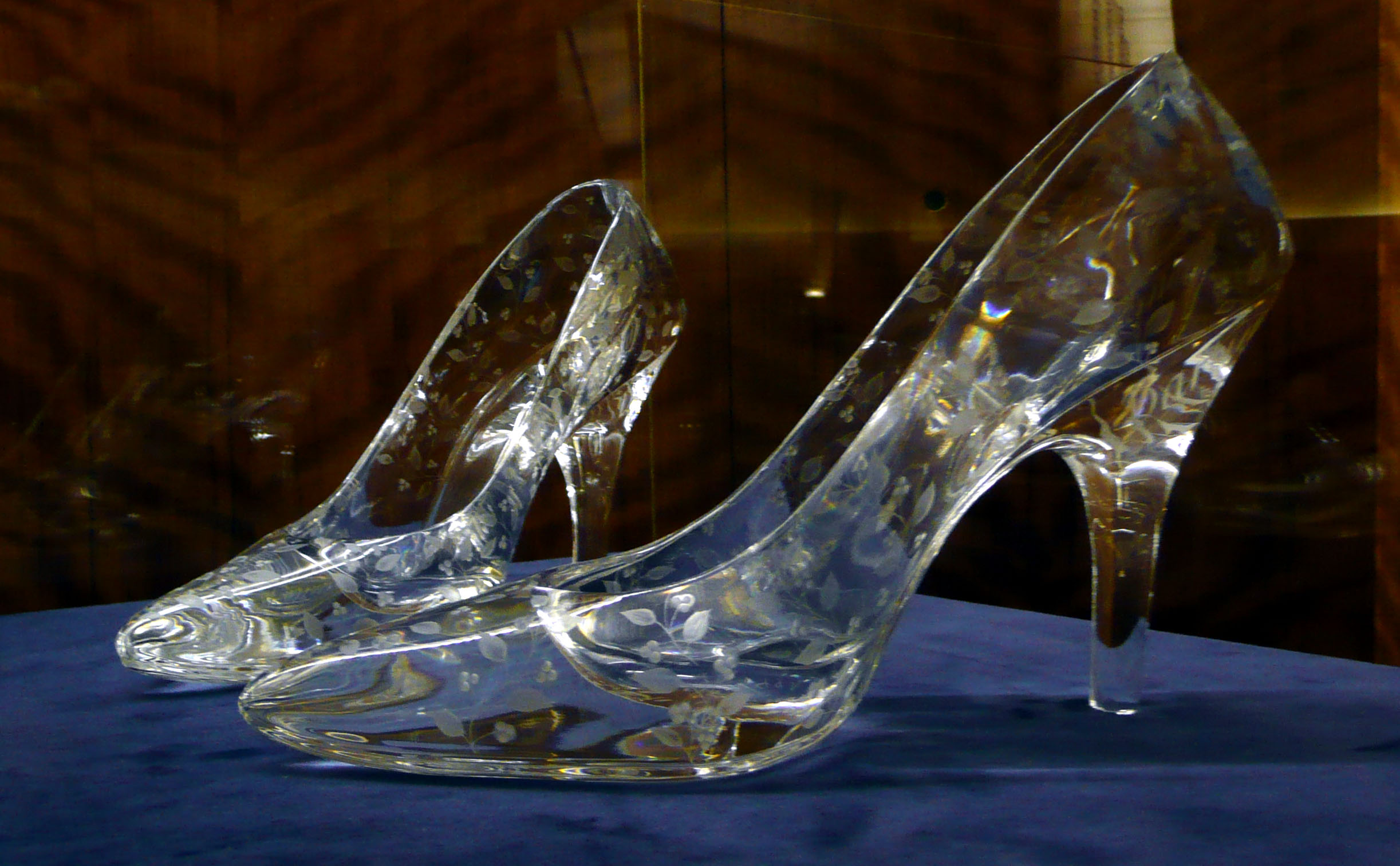
Pair of crystal glass slippers presented to the City of Plymouth by the Plymouth Committee of the British Olympic Appeal and Mr & Mrs M. Hockin to mark the occasion of Her Royal Highness the Princess Royal attending the British Olympic Appeal Gala Ball on 15 July 1988

Today Dartington Crystal is a major private employer in Torrington and surrounding rural areas. All hand-made crystal items are still produced at Dartington Crystal in Torrington meaning the factory is the only working hand-made tableware producing crystal factory left in the UK. Given the demand for this product, the company does however outsource some ranges of items from within the EU (especially machine-made) crystal where Dartington still continue a rigorous quality control process.

== Products ==
Dartington Crystal's products date back to the 1970s, Frank Thrower's Scandinavian influenced designs such as Sharon, Exmoor, and Dimple distinguished Dartington from other manufacturers, who concentrated on cut crystal styles. Ranges include Wine Master, Florabundance as well as Sharon, Exmoor, and Dimple, which are still made today.

== Corporate ==
The company is also known for its personalized, corporate gifts and special commissions, including an FA Cup trophy replica used in the celebrations of the 30th anniversary of Sunderland's FA Cup triumph over Leeds United. This replica can be seen in the Visitors Centre at the Torrington site.

Commissions include Holland & Holland, Rolls-Royce Motors, P&O Cruises and Chivas Regal as well as many others.

== UK manufacturing ==
Dartington are one of just a few remaining large scale producers of crystal and glass in the UK, with 150 staff. Not all of their crystal is made in Devon; they also design and source other glassware from European suppliers. In addition to Dartington crystal and glass products, the company owns and markets the Caithness Glass and Royal Brierley Crystal brands. They also sell and distribute John Beswick ceramic character sculptures.
