= List of Royal Doulton figurines =

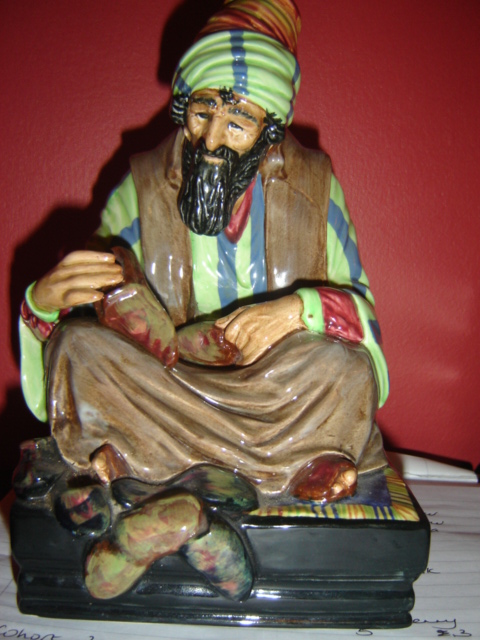
Cobbler HN1706

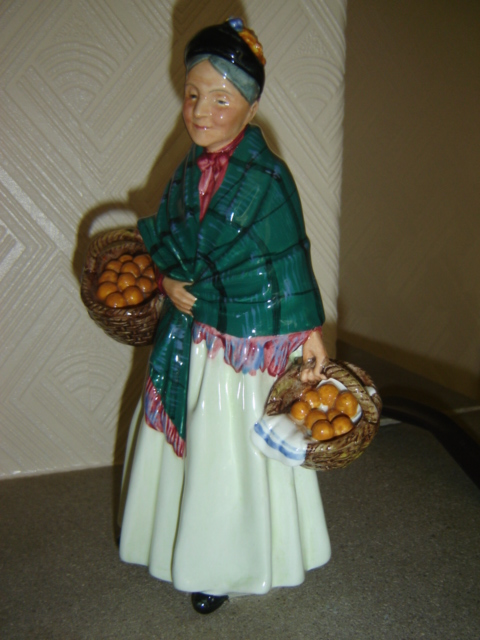
Orange Lady HN1953

This is a list of Royal Doulton figurines in ascending order by HN number. HN is named after Harry Nixon (1886–1955), head of the Royal Doulton painting department who joined Doulton in 1900. This list includes the HN number, the title of the Royal Doulton figurine, the designer(s), the date introduced, and if discontinued, the date discontinued.

== HN1 to 99 ==
| # | Title | Colour | Designer(s) | From | To |
|---|---|---|---|---|---|
| HN1 | Darling | Light grey | Charles Vyse | 1913 | 1928 |
| HN2 | Elizabeth Fry | Light blue, green base | Charles Vyse | 1913 | 1938 |
| HN2A | Elizabeth Fry | Light blue, blue base | Charles Vyse | 1913 | 1938 |
| HN3 | Milking Time | Blue dress, white apron | Phoebe Stabler | 1913 | 1938 |
| HN4 | Picardy Peasant (Female) | White hat, blue skirt | Phoebe Stabler | 1913 | 1938 |
| HN5 | Picardy Peasant (Female) | Dove grey costume | Phoebe Stabler | 1913 | 1938 |
| HN6 | Dunce | Light blue | Charles J Noke | 1913 | 1938 |
| HN7 | Pedlar Wolf | Blue and black | Charles J Noke | 1913 | 1938 |
| HN8 | The Crinoline | Lavender | George Lambert | 1913 | 1938 |
| HN9 | The Crinoline | Pale green skirt with flower sprays | George Lambert | 1913 | 1938 |
| HN9A | The Crinoline | Pale green skirt no flower sprays | George Lambert | 1913 | 1938 |
| HN10 | Madonna of the Square | Lilac costume | Phoebe Stabler | 1913 | 1936 |
| HN10A | Madonna of the Square | Green and blue costume | Phoebe Stabler | 1913 | 1936 |
| HN11 | Madonna of the Square | Grey costume | Phoebe Stabler | 1913 | 1938 |
| HN12 | Baby | Light blue | Charles J Noke | 1913 | 1938 |
| HN13 | Picardy Peasant (Male) | Blue costume with white cap | Phoebe Stabler | 1913 | 1938 |
| HN14 | Madonna of the Square | Blue | Phoebe Stabler | 1913 | 1938 |
| HN15 | Sleepy Scholar | Blue | William White | 1913 | 1938 |
| HN16 | Sleepy Scholar | Green | William White | 1913 | 1938 |
| HN17 | Picardy Peasant (Male) | Green hat, green trousers | Phoebe Stabler | 1913 | 1938 |
| HN17A | Picardy Peasant (Female) | Green | Phoebe Stabler | 1913 | 1938 |
| HN18 | Pussy (also called The Black Cat) | Light blue | F C Stone | 1913 | 1938 |
| HN19 | Picardy Peasant (Male) | Green costume | Phoebe Stabler | 1913 | 1938 |
| HN20 | The Coquette | Blue | William White | 1913 | 1938 |
| HN20A | The Coquette | Green | William White | 1913 | 1938 |
| HN21 | The Crinoline | Yellow skirt with rosebuds | George Lambert | 1913 | 1938 |
| HN21A | The Crinoline | Yellow skirt no rosebuds | George Lambert | 1913 | 1938 |
| HN22 | The Lavender Woman | Light blue | Phoebe Stabler | 1913 | 1938 |
| HN23 | The Lavender Woman | Green | Phoebe Stabler | 1913 | 1938 |
| HN23A | The Lavender Woman | Blue and green | Phoebe Stabler | 1913 | 1938 |
| HN24 | Sleep | Light blue | Phoebe Stabler | 1913 | 1938 |
| HN24A | Sleep | Dark blue | Phoebe Stabler | 1913 | 1938 |
| HN25 | Sleep | Dark green | Phoebe Stabler | 1913 | 1938 |
| HN25A | Sleep | Dark green | Phoebe Stabler | 1913 | 1938 |
| HN26 | The Diligent Scholar (also called The Attentive Scholar) | Mottled brown and green | William White | 1913 | 1938 |
| HN27 | Madonna of the Square | Mottled green and blue costume | Phoebe Stabler | 1913 | 1938 |
| HN28 | Motherhood | Light blue | Phoebe Stabler | 1913 | 1938 |
| HN29 | The Sleepy Scholar | Brown | William White | 1913 | 1938 |
| HN30 | The Motherhood | White and blue | Phoebe Stabler | 1913 | 1938 |
| HN31 | The Return of Persephone | Grey and grey-blue | Charles Vyse | 1913 | 1938 |
| HN32 | Child on Crab | Pale-blue, green and brown | Charles J Noke | 1913 | 1938 |
| HN33 | An Arab (also called The Moor) | Green costume, blue cloak | Charles J Noke | 1913 | 1938 |
| HN34 | Moorish Minstrel | Deep purple | Charles J Noke | 1913 | 1938 |
| HN35 | Charley's Aunt (Style One, Model 161) | Black and white | Albert Toft | 1914 | 1938 |
| HN36 | The Sentimental Pierrot | Grey | Charles J Noke | 1914 | 1938 |
| HN37 | The Coquette | Green costume with flower sprays | William White | 1914 | 1938 |
| HN38 | The Carpet Vendor (Style One, Model 163A) | Blue and yellow | Charles J Noke | 1914 | 1938 |
| HN38A | The Carpet Vendor (Style One, Model 163A) | Blue-and-yellow-patterned long carpet | Charles J Noke | 1914 | 1938 |
| HN39 | Myfanwy Jones (also called The Welsh Girl) | Red, black, purple | Ernest W Light | 1914 | 1938 |
| HN40 | A Lady of the Elizabethan Period (Style One, Model 165, also called Elizabethan Lady) | Orange and brown with pattern | Ernest W Light | 1914 | 1938 |
| HN40A | A Lady of the Elizabethan Period (Style One, Model 165, also called Elizabethan Lady) | Orange and brown | Ernest W Light | 1914 | 1938 |
| HN41 | A Lady of the Georgian Period | Gold and blue | Ernest W Light | 1914 | 1938 |
| HN42 | Robert Burns (Style One) | Brown, green and yellow | Ernest W Light | 1914 | 1938 |
| HN43 | A Woman of the Time of Henry VI | Green and yellow | Ernest W Light | 1914 | 1938 |
| HN44 | A Lilac Shawl (also called In Grandma's Days and The Poke Bonnet) | Cream and blue | Charles J Noke | 1915 | 1938 |
| HN44A | A Lilac Shawl (also called In Grandma's Days and The Poke Bonnet) | White and lilac | Charles J Noke | 1915 | 1938 |
| HN45 | A Jester (Style One) | Black and white | Charles J Noke | 1915 | 1938 |
| HN45A | A Jester (Style Two) | Green and white | Charles J Noke | 1915 | 1938 |
| HN45B | A Jester (Style Two) | Red and white | Charles J Noke | 1915 | 1938 |
| HN46 | The Gainsborough Hat | Lavender | Harry Tittensor | 1915 | 1938 |
| HN46A | The Gainsborough Hat | Lavender with black collar | Harry Tittensor | 1915 | 1938 |
| HN47 | Gainsborough Hat | Green | Harry Tittensor | 1915 | 1938 |
| HN48 | Lady of the Fan | Lavender | Ernest W Light | 1916 | 1938 |
| HN48A | Lady with rose | Cream and orange | Ernest W Light | 1916 | 1938 |
| HN49 | Under the Gooseberry Bush | Green and brown | Charles J Noke | 1916 | 1938 |
| HN50 | A Spook (Style One) | Green robe, black cap | Harry Tittensor | 1916 | 1938 |
| HN51 | A Spook (Style One) | Green robe, red cap | Harry Tittensor | 1916 | 1938 |
| HN51A | A Spook (Style One) | Green robe, black cap | Harry Tittensor | 1916 | 1938 |
| HN51B | A Spook (Style One) | Blue robe, red cap | Harry Tittensor | 1916 | 1938 |
| HN52 | Lady of the Fan | Yellow | Ernest W Light | 1916 | 1938 |
| HN52A | Lady with Rose | Yellow | Ernest W Light | 1916 | 1938 |
| HN53 | Lady of the Fan | Dark purple | Ernest W Light | 1916 | 1938 |
| HN53A | Lady of the Fan | Green | Ernest W Light | 1916 | 1938 |
| HN54 | The Ermine Muff (also called Lady With Ermine Muff and Lady Ermine) | Green | Charles J Noke | 1916 | 1938 |
| HN55 | A Jester (Style Two) | Black and lavender | Charles J Noke | 1916 | 1938 |
| HN56 | The Land of Nod | Ivory, green candlestick | Harry Tittensor | 1916 | 1938 |
| HN56A | The Land of Nod | Light grey, green candlestick | Harry Tittensor | 1916 | 1938 |
| HN56B | The Land of Nod | Light grey, red candlestick | Harry Tittensor | 1916 | 1938 |
| HN57 | The Curtsey | Orange | Ernest W Light | 1916 | 1938 |
| HN57A | The Flounced Skirt (also called The Bow) | Orange | Ernest W Light | 1916 | 1938 |
| HN57B | The Curtsey | Lavender | Ernest W Light | 1916 | 1938 |
| HN58 | A Spook | Colour unknown | Harry Tittensor | 1916 | 1938 |
| HN59 | Upon Her Cheeks She Wept | Grey dress | Lawrence Perugini | 1916 | 1938 |
| HN60 | Shy Anne | Blue dress with flowers, blue bow in hair | Lawrence Perugini | 1916 | 1938 |
| HN61 | Katharine | Green | Ernest W Light | 1916 | 1938 |
| HN62 | A Child's Grace | Green and black coat with yellow dress | Lawrence Perugini | 1916 | 1938 |
| HN62A | A Child's Grace | Green coat with yellow dress | Lawrence Perugini | 1916 | 1938 |
| HN63 | The Little Hand | Green and yellow | Harry Tittensor | 1916 | 1938 |
| HN64 | Shy Anne | Pale blue, white bow in hair | Lawrence Perugini | 1916 | 1938 |
| HN65 | Shy Anne | Pale blue, dark blue stripe around hem of skirt | Lawrence Perugini | 1916 | 1938 |
| HN66 | The Flounced Skirt (also called The Bow) | Lavender | Ernest W Light | 1916 | 1938 |
| HN66A | The Curtsey | Lavender | Ernest W Light | 1916 | 1938 |
| HN67 | The Little Hand | Grey and yellow | Harry Tittensor | 1916 | 1938 |
| HN68 | Lady With Rose | Green and yellow | Ernest W Light | 1916 | 1938 |
| HN69 | Pretty Lady | Blue dress with flowers | Harry Tittensor | 1916 | 1938 |
| HN70 | Pretty Lady | Grey | Harry Tittensor | 1916 | 1938 |
| HN71 | A Jester (Style One, 9" tall) | Green checks | Charles J Noke | 1917 | 1938 |
| HN71A | A Jester (Style One, 9.5" tall) | Green checks | Charles J Noke | 1917 | 1938 |
| HN72 | An Orange Vendor | Green, white and orange | Charles J Noke | 1917 | 1938 |
| HN73 | A Lady of the Elizabethan Period (Style One, also called Elizabethan Lady) | Dark turquoise | Ernest W Light | 1917 | 1938 |
| HN74 | Katherine | Light blue dress with green | Ernest W Light | 1917 | 1938 |
| HN75 | Blue Beard (With Plume on Turban) (Style One) | Light blue | Ernest W Light | 1917 | 1938 |
| HN76 | The Carpet Vendor (Style One) | Blue and orange | Charles J Noke | 1917 | 1938 |
| HN77 | The Flounced Skirt (also called The Bow) | Yellow dress with black | Ernest W Light | 1917 | 1938 |
| HN78 | The Flounced Skirt (also called The Bow) | Yellow dress with flowers | Ernest W Light | 1917 | 1938 |
| HN79 | Shylock | Multi-coloured robe, yellow | Charles J Noke | 1917 | 1938 |
| HN80 | Fisherwoman (also called Waiting For The Boats and Looking For The Boats) | Lavender, pink and green | Unknown | 1917 | 1938 |
| HN81 | The Shepherd (Style One) | Brown | Charles J Noke | 1918 | 1938 |
| HN82 | Lady with an Ermine Muff (also called Making Call and Afternoon Call) | Grey and cream, grey hat | Ernest W Light | 1918 | 1938 |
| HN83 | The Lady Anne | Yellow | Ernest W Light | 1918 | 1938 |
| HN84 | Mandarin (Style One, also called Chinese Mandarin and The Mikado) | Mauve and green | Charles J Noke | 1918 | 1938 |
| HN85 | Jack Point | Red checks, green base | Charles J Noke | 1918 | 1938 |
| HN86 | Out for a Walk | Grey, white and black | Harry Tittensor | 1918 | 1938 |
| HN87 | The Lady Anne | Green | Ernest W Light | 1918 | 1938 |
| HN88 | Spooks (also called Double Spook) | Green robes, black caps | Charles J Noke | 1918 | 1938 |
| HN89 | Spooks (also called Double Spook) | Green robes, red caps | Charles J Noke | 1918 | 1938 |
| HN90 | Doris Keene as Cavallini (Style One) | Dark green | Charles J Noke | 1918 | 1938 |
| HN91 | Jack Point | Green and black checked suit | Charles J Noke | 1918 | 1938 |
| HN92 | Myfanwy Jones (also called The Welsh Girl) | Blue-grey costume | Ernest W Light | 1918 | 1938 |
| HN93 | The Lady Anne | Blue | Ernest W Light | 1918 | 1938 |
| HN94 | The Young Knight | Purple, green and black | Charles J Noke | 1918 | 1938 |
| HN95 | Europa and the Bull (Style One) | Lavender with browns | Harry Tittensor | 1918 | 1938 |
| HN96 | Doris Keene as Cavallini (Style Two, also called Romance) | Black and white | Charles J Noke | 1918 | 1938 |
| HN97 | The Mermaid | Green and cream | Harry Tittensor | 1918 | 1938 |
| HN98 | Guy Fawkes | Red cloak, black hat and robes | Charles J Noke | 1918 | 1938 |
| HN99 | Jack Point | Purple and green | Charles J Noke | 1918 | 1938 |

== HN100 to 199 ==
| # | Title | Designer(s) | From | To |
|---|---|---|---|---|
| HN100 | Fox in Hunting Dress | Charles J Noke | 1913 | 1942 |
| HN101 | Rabbit in Morning Dress | Charles J. Noke | 1913- | |
| HN102 | Hare in White Coat | | | |
| HN103 | Flambe Pair Penguins | | | |
| HN104 | | | | |
| HN105 | Collie, Seated (sable, 7.25" tall) | | 1912 | 1946 |
| HN106 | Collie, Seated (Black) | | | |
| HN107 | Crouching Hare, Style 1 (Flambe) | Charles J. Noke | 1913 | <1946 |
| HN108 | Flambe Lop Eared Hare | | | |
| HN109 | Cat Seated (Flambe) | Charles J. Noke | 1920 | 1996 |
| HN110 | Russell Terrier with Ball | | | |
| HN111 | Cockerel Crowing | | 1912 | |
| HN112 | Seated Collie (Alsatian) | | | |
| HN113 | Emperor Penguin (Flambe) | Charles J. Noke | | |
| HN114 | Mallard Duck | | | |
| HN115 | Flambe Squirrel, seated | Unknown | 1912 | 1946 |
| HN116 | Mallard Duck | | 1913 | 1946 |
| HN117 | Two Foxes, Curled | | 1912 | 1946 |
| HN117A | Flambe Fox Stalking | | 1947 | |
| HN118 | Flambe Monkey Seated | | 1912 | 1946 |
| HN119 | Polar Bear on Cube | | 1912 | 1936 |
| HN120 | Cat Seated (White, Black) | Charles J Noke | 1912 | 1946 |
| HN121 | Flambe Seated Polar Bear | | 1912 | 1936 |
| HN122 | Fantail Pigeons | Unknown | ~1920's | |
| HN123 | Pelican, Beak up | | 1920s | 1930s |
| HN124 | Flambe Cockerel | | | |
| HN125 | Flambe Guinea Hen | Charles J Noke | 1912 | |
| HN126 | Flambe Crouching Hare | | | |
| HN127 | Cavalier King Charles Spaniel | | | |
| HN128 | Puppy sitting with head down looking left at tail | | | |
| HN129 | Seated Bulldog (Style 4) | | 1913 | |
| HN130 | Flambe Fox (Seated, brown, 8.75" tall, LG) | Charles J Noke | 1913 | 1946 |
| HN131 | Kingfisher on a rock | | | |
| HN132 | Drake on a rock | | 1913 | 1936 |
| HN133 | Penguins (6") | Unknown | 1913 | 1946 |
| HN134 | Penguin | | 1913 | 1946 |
| HN135 | Raven | | | |
| HN136 | Swallow on Rock | | | |
| HN137A | Fledgling | | | |
| HN138 | Flambe Squirrel | | | |
| HN139 | Flambe Eagle on Rock | | | |
| HN140 | Seated Ape | | 1917 | 1936 |
| HN141 | Flambe Standing Rhinoceros | | | |
| HN142 | Hare | | | |
| HN143 | Fox Terrier | | | |
| HN144 | Robin (Brown with Red Chest) | | | |
| HN145 | Fledgling | | 1917 | 1936 |
| HN146 | Bulldog "Old Bill" brown w/helmet and haversack | Unknown | 1918 | 1925 |
| HN147A | Flambe Stalking Fox (red/black, 5/5" long) | | 1912 | 1996 |
| HN147A-1 | Flambe Stalking Fox | | | |
| HN147B | Flambe Fox Seated (red/black, 4.5" tall) | | 1912 | 1996 |
| HN147C | Flambe Fox Seated (Style one, 4.75" tall, med) | Charles Noke | 1912 | 1946 |
| HN148B | Duck Resting Model #112 | | 1912 | 1996 |
| HN149 | Swallow on Rock | | | |
| HN150 | Duck Head Stretched Forward | | | |
| HN151 | Lop-Eared Rabbit | | 1918 | 1946 |
| HN152 | | | | |
| HN153 | Bulldog With Tam O'Shanter and Haversack | | | |
| HN154 | Kateroo | Charles Noke | | |
| HN155 | | | | |
| HN156 | | | | |
| HN157 | | | | |
| HN158 | Toucan on Perch (Green and Yellow) | | | |
| HN159 | Toucan On Perch | | 1918 | 1936 |
| HN160 | Owl with Owlet Under Wing | | | |
| HN161 | Thrush Chicks | | 1918 | !946 |
| HN162 | Butterfly Clip (Orange) | | | |
| HN163 | Budgerigar on Tree Stump (Green and Yellow) | | | |
| HN164 | Rooster | | | |
| HN165 | | | | |
| HN166R | Flambe Seated on Base Foxhound | | 1917 | 1946 |
| HN167 | | | | |
| HN168 | Male Tern | | | |
| HN169 | The Owl | | | |
| HN170 | Titanian Comic Brown Bear | Charles Noke | | |
| HN171 | Fledglings Four | | 1918 | 1946 |
| HN172 | Bison | Leslie Harradine | 1924 | |
| HN173 | Flambe Granny Owl | Charles Noke | | |
| HN174 | | | | |
| HN175 | | | | |
| HN176 | Seated Bloodhound | | 1919 | |
| HN177 | | | | |
| HN178 | Cockerel, Crouching (Red, Blue, Black, Green) | | 1919 | 1936 |
| HN179 | Kingsware Lidded Round Tobacco Jar, Curled Foxes | | | |
| HN180 | Cockerel Crouching (Black, Red, White) | | | |
| HN181 | Flambe Elephant (Trunk Up Curled) | | | |
| HN182 | | | | |
| HN183 | | | | |
| HN184 | | | | |
| HN185 | Cockatoo on Rock | | | |
| HN186 | Flambe Elephant (Trunk Down Curled) | Charles Noke | 1913 | 1946 |
| HN187 | Flambe Owl and Owlet | | | |
| HN188 | Newborn Duckling | | 1920 | 1936 |
| HN189 | | | | |
| HN190 | Flambe Fox Terrier | | | |
| HN191 | Cockatoo On A Rock (Blue) | | | |
| HN192 | Cockatoo On Rock (Orange) | | | |
| HN193 | Tortoise (Red, Grey, Ochre) | | | |
| HN194 | Terrier Puppy, on side | Unknown | 1920 | |
| HN195 | | | | |
| HN196 | | | | |
| HN197 | Weaver Bird on Rock | | | |
| HN198 | Flambe King Penguin and Chick | | | |
| HN199 | Budgerigar on Stump | | 1918 | 1935 |

== HN200 to 299 ==
| # | Title | Designer(s) | From | To |
|---|---|---|---|---|
| HN200 | | | | |
| HN201 | | | | |
| HN202 | | | | |
| HN203 | | | | |
| HN204 | | | | |
| HN205 | | | | |
| HN206 | | | | |
| HN207 | | | | |
| HN208 | | | | |
| HN209 | | | | |
| HN210 | | | | |
| HN211 | Black Headed Seagull, Male | Unknown | 1920 | 1946 |
| HN212 | Black Headed Gull Seagull in Winter Plumage | | | |
| HN213 | | | | |
| HN214 | | | | |
| HN215 | | | | |
| HN216 | | | | |
| HN217 | | | | |
| HN218 | | | | |
| HN219 | Barbara | Peter Gee | | |
| HN220 | | | | |
| HN221 | | | | |
| HN222 | | | | |
| HN223 | | | | |
| HN224 | | | | |
| HN225 | Crouching Tiger | Charles J Noke | 1912 | 1968 |
| HN226 | Leading Lady | | | |
| HN227 | | | | |
| HN228 | | | | |
| HN229 | Duck, head stretched forward | | | |
| HN230 | | | | |
| HN231 | | | | |
| HN232 | | | | |
| HN233 | | | | |
| HN234 | | | | |
| HN235 | | | | |
| HN236 | | | | |
| HN237 | | | | |
| HN238 | | | | |
| HN239 | | | | |
| HN240 | | | | |
| HN241 | | | | |
| HN242 | | | | |
| HN243 | Pig, bowl (2" H) | | 1920 | 1936 |
| HN244 | | | | |
| HN245 | | | | |
| HN246 | | | | |
| HN247 | | | | |
| HN248 | | | | |
| HN249 | | | | |
| HN250 | | | | |
| HN251 | | | | |
| HN252 | | | | |
| HN253 | | | | |
| HN254 | Belle | | | |
| HN255 | | | | |
| HN256 | | | | |
| HN257 | | | | |
| HN258 | Alice | | | |
| HN259 | | | | |
| HN260 | | | | |
| HN261 | | | | |
| HN262 | | | | |
| HN263 | | | | |
| HN264 | | | | |
| HN265 | | | | |
| HN266 | | | | |
| HN267 | Crouching Cockerel | | 1922 | 1936 |
| HN268 | | | | |
| HN269 | | | | |
| HN270 | | | | |
| HN271 | | | | |
| HN272 | | | | |
| HN273 | | | | |
| HN274 | | | | |
| HN275 | | | | |
| HN276 | | | | |
| HN277 | | | | |
| HN278 | | | | |
| HN279 | | | | |
| HN280 | | | | |
| HN281 | | | | |
| HN282 | | | | |
| HN283 | | | | |
| HN284 | | | | |
| HN285 | | | | |
| HN286 | | | | |
| HN287 | | | | |
| HN288 | | | | |
| HN289 | | | | |
| HN290 | | | | |
| HN291 | | | | |
| HN292 | | | | |
| HN293 | | | | |
| HN294 | | | | |
| HN295 | | | | |
| HN296 | | | | |
| HN297 | | | | |
| HN298 | | | | |
| HN299 | | | | |

== HN300 to 399 ==
| # | Title | Colour | Designer(s) | From | To |
|---|---|---|---|---|---|
| HN300 | The Mermaid | Green and cream red berries in hair | Harry Tittensor | 1918 | 1936 |
| HN301 | Moorish Piper Minstrel | Purple | Charles J Noke | 1918 | 1938 |
| HN302 | Pretty Lady | Green and lavender dress | Harry Tittensor | 1918 | 1938 |
| HN303 | Motherhood | White dress with black | Phoebe Stabler | 1918 | 1938 |
| HN304 | Lady with Rose | Patterned lavender dress | Ernest W Light | 1918 | 1938 |
| HN305 | A Scribe | Green, blue and orange | Charles J Noke | 1918 | 1938 |
| HN306 | Milking Time | Light blue dress with black | Phoebe Stabler | 1918 | 1938 |
| HN307 | The Sentimental Pierrot | Black, white | Charles J Noke | 1918 | 1938 |
| HN308 | A Jester (Style Two) | Black and lavender | Charles J Noke | 1918 | 1938 |
| HN309 | A Lady of the Elizabethan Period (Style Two, also called Elizabethan Lady) | Dark blue, yellow-green | Ernest W Light | 1918 | 1938 |
| HN310 | Dunce | Black and white with green base | Charles J Noke | 1918 | 1938 |
| HN311 | Dancing Figure | Pink | Unknown | 1918 | 1938 |
| HN312 | Spring (Style One) | Yellow | Unknown | 1918 | 1938 |
| HN313 | Summer (Style One) | Pale green | Unknown | 1918 | 1938 |
| HN314 | Autumn (Style One) | Lavender | Unknown | 1918 | 1938 |
| HN315 | Winter (Style One) | Pale green | Unknown | 1918 | 1938 |
| HN316 | A Mandarin (Style One, also called Chinese Mandarin and The Mikado) | Black and yellow | Charles J Noke | 1918 | 1938 |
| HN317 | Shylock | Brown and green | Charles J Noke | 1918 | 1938 |
| HN318 | A Mandarin (Style One, also called Chinese Mandarin and The Mikado) | Gold | Charles J Noke | 1918 | 1938 |
| HN319 | A Gnome | Light blue | Harry Tittensor | 1918 | 1938 |
| HN320 | A Jester (Style One) | Green and black | Charles J Noke | 1918 | 1938 |
| HN321 | Digger (New Zealand) | Mottled green | Ernest W Light | 1918 | 1938 |
| HN322 | Digger (Australian); Modelled on Austin Shorter of John Shorter Pty Ltd | Brown | Ernest W Light | 1918 | 1938 |
| HN323 | Blighty | Green | Ernest W Light | 1918 | 1938 |
| HN324 | A Scribe | Brown, green and blue | Charles J Noke | 1918 | 1938 |
| HN325 | Pussy (also called The Black Cat) | White dress with black | F C Stone | 1918 | 1938 |
| HN326 | Madonna of the Square | Grey | Phoebe Stabler | 1918 | 1938 |
| HN327 | The Curtsy | Blue | Ernest W Light | 1918 | 1938 |
| HN328 | Moorish Piper Minstrel | Green and brown stripes | Charles J Noke | 1918 | 1938 |
| HN329 | The Gainsborough Hat | Patterned blue dress | Harry Tittensor | 1918 | 1938 |
| HN330 | Pretty Lady | Patterned blue dress | Harry Tittensor | 1918 | 1938 |
| HN331 | A Lady of the Georgian Period | Mottled green overskirt, yellow underskirt | Ernest W Light | 1918 | 1938 |
| HN332 | The Ermine Muff (also called Lady With Ermine Muff and Lady Ermine) | Red coat, green and yellow skirt | Charles J Noke | 1918 | 1938 |
| HN333 | The Flounced Skirt (also called The Bow) | Green and blue | Ernest W Light | 1918 | 1938 |
| HN334 | The Curtsey | Lavender | Ernest W Light | 1918 | 1938 |
| HN335 | Lady of the Fan | Blue | Ernest W Light | 1919 | 1938 |
| HN336 | Lady With Rose | Multi-coloured | Ernest W Light | 1919 | 1938 |
| HN337 | The Parson's Daughter | Lavender dress with flowers | Harry Tittensor | 1919 | 1938 |
| HN338 | The Parson's Daughter | Green and red | Harry Tittensor | 1919 | 1938 |
| HN339 | In Grandma's Days (also called The Poke Bonnet and A Lilac Shawl) | Green and yellow | Charles J Noke | 1919 | 1938 |
| HN340 | In Grandma's Days (also called The Poke Bonnet and A Lilac Shawl) | Yellow and lavender | Charles J Noke | 1919 | 1938 |
| HN341 | Katharine | Red | Ernest W Light | 1919 | 1938 |
| HN342 | The Lavender Woman | Multi-coloured dress, lavender shawl | Phoebe Stabler | 1919 | 1938 |
| HN343 | An Arab (also called The Moor) | Yellow and purple | Charles J Noke | 1919 | 1938 |
| HN344 | Henry Irving as Cardinal Wolsey | Red | Charles J Noke | 1919 | 1949 |
| HN345 | Doris Keene as Cavallini (Style Two) | Black and white, dark collar and striped muff | Charles J Noke | 1919 | 1945 |
| HN346 | Tony Weller (Style One) | Green, blue and brown | Charles J Noke | 1919 | 1938 |
| HN347 | Guy Fawkes | Brown cloak | Charles J Noke | 1919 | 1938 |
| HN348 | The Carpet Vendor (Style Two) | Turquoise, long carpet | Charles J Noke | 1919 | 1938 |
| HN349 | Fisherwomen (also called Waiting For The Boats and Looking For The Boats) | Lavender, yellow and green | Unknown | 1919 | 1938 |
| HN350 | The Carpet Vendor (Style One) | Blue | Charles J Noke | 1919 | 1938 |
| HN351 | Picardy Peasant (Woman) | Blue, striped skirt, spotted hat | Pheobe Stabler | 1919 | 1938 |
| HN352 | The Gainsborough Hat | Yellow dress, purple hat | Harry Tittensor | 1919 | 1938 |
| HN353 | Digger (Australian) | Brown | Ernest W Light | 1919 | 1938 |
| HN354 | A Geisha (Style One, also called Japanese Lady) | Yellow | Harry Tittensor | 1919 | 1938 |
| HN355 | Dolly (Style One) | Blue | Charles J Noke | 1919 | 1938 |
| HN356 | Sir Thomas Lovell | Brown and green | Charles J Noke | 1919 | 1938 |
| HN357 | Dunce | Light brown | Charles J Noke | 1919 | 1938 |
| HN358 | An Old King | Green and purple | Charles J Noke | 1919 | 1938 |
| HN359 | Fisherwomen (also called Waiting For The Boats and Looking For The Boats) | Lavender, red and green | Unknown | 1919 | 1938 |
| HN360 | No Figurine | | | | |
| HN361 | Pretty Lady | Turquoise | Harry Tittensor | 1919 | 1938 |
| HN362 | The Poke Bonnet (also called In Grandma's Days and A Lilac Shawl) | Green, yellow, red | Charles J Noke | 1919 | 1938 |
| HN363 | The Curtsey | Lavender and peach | Ernest W Light | 1919 | 1938 |
| HN364 | A Moorish Minstrel | Blue, green and orange | Charles J Noke | 1920 | 1938 |
| HN365 | Double Jester | Brown, green and purple | Charles J Noke | 1920 | 1938 |
| HN366 | A Mandarin (Style Two) | Yellow and blue | Charles J Noke | 1920 | 1938 |
| HN367 | A Jester (Style One) | Green and red | Charles J Noke | 1920 | 1938 |
| HN368 | Tony Weller (Style One) | Green and brown | Charles J Noke | 1920 | 1938 |
| HN369 | Cavalier (Style One) | Turquoise | Unknown | 1920 | 1938 |
| HN370 | Henry VIII (Style One) | Brown, green and purple | Charles J Noke | 1920 | 1938 |
| HN371 | The Curtsy | Yellow | Ernest W Light | 1919 | 1938 |
| HN372 | Spooks (also called Double Spook) | Brown | Charles J Noke | 1920 | 1938 |
| HN373 | Boy on Crocodile | Green-brown | Charles J Noke | 1920 | 1938 |
| HN374 | Lady and Blackamoor (Style One) | Blue and green | Harry Tittensor | 1920 | 1938 |
| HN375 | Lady and Blackamoor (Style Two) | Purple and yellow | Harry Tittensor | 1920 | 1938 |
| HN376 | A Geisha (Style One, also called Japanese Lady) | Blue and yellow | Harry Tittensor | 1920 | 1938 |
| HN376A | A Geisha (Style One, also called Japanese Lady) | Blue | Harry Tittensor | 1920 | 1938 |
| HN377 | Lady and Blackamoor (Style Two) | Pink and green | Harry Tittensor | 1920 | 1938 |
| HN378 | An Arab (also called The Moor) | Green, brown and yellow | Charles J Noke | 1920 | 1938 |
| HN379 | Ellen Terry as Queen Catherine | Purple and blue | Charles J Noke | 1920 | 1949 |
| HN380 | A Gnome | Purple | Harry Tittensor | 1920 | 1938 |
| HN381 | A Gnome | Green | Harry Tittensor | 1920 | 1938 |
| HN382 | A Mandarin (Style One, also called Chinese Mandarin and The Mikado) | Green | Charles J Noke | 1920 | 1938 |
| HN383 | The Gainsborough Hat | Green stripes | Harry Tittensor | 1920 | 1938 |
| HN384 | Pretty Lady | Red | Harry Tittensor | 1920 | 1938 |
| HN385 | St. George (Style One) | Multi-coloured | S Thorogood | 1920 | 1938 |
| HN386 | St. George (Style One) | Blue and white | S Thorogood | 1920 | 1938 |
| HN387 | A Geisha (Style One, also called Japanese Lady) | Blue and yellow | Harry Tittensor | 1920 | 1938 |
| HN388 | In Grandma's Days (also called The Poke Bonnet and A Lilac Shawl) | Blue | Charles J Noke | 1920 | 1938 |
| HN389 | The Little Mother (Style One, also called Dolly) | Pink dress, blond hair | Harry Tittensor | 1920 | 1938 |
| HN390 | The Little Mother (Style Two, also called Dolly) | Pink dress, brown hair | Harry Tittensor | 1920 | 1938 |
| HN391 | The Princess | Green | Unknown | 1920 | 1938 |
| HN392 | The Princess | Multi-coloured | Unknown | 1920 | 1938 |
| HN393 | Lady Without Bouquet | Pink and lilac | G Lambert | 1920 | 1938 |
| HN394 | Lady Without Bouquet | Blue and yellow | G Lambert | 1920 | 1938 |
| HN395 | Contentment | Yellow and blue | Leslie Harradine | 1920 | 1938 |
| HN396 | Contentment | Blue, yellow and pink | Leslie Harradine | 1920 | 1938 |
| HN397 | Puff and Powder | Yellow skirt, brown bodice | Leslie Harradine | 1920 | 1938 |
| HN398 | Puff and Powder | Lavender | Leslie Harradine | 1920 | 1938 |
| HN399 | Japanese Fan | Blue and yellow | Leslie Harradine | 1920 | 1938 |

== HN400 to 499 ==
| # | Title | Colour | Designer(s) | From | To |
|---|---|---|---|---|---|
| HN400 | Puff and Powder | Green, blue and yellow | Leslie Harradine | 1920 | 1938 |
| HN401 | Marie (Style One) | Pink, cream and blue | Leslie Harradine | 1920 | 1938 |
| HN402 | Betty (Style One) | Pink | Leslie Harradine | 1920 | 1938 |
| HN403 | Betty (Style One) | Green | Leslie Harradine | 1920 | 1938 |
| HN404 | King Charles I | Black, pink base | Charles J Noke & Harry Tittensor | 1921 | 1950 |
| HN405 | Japanese Fan | Light yellow | Harry Tittensor | 1920 | 1938 |
| HN406 | The Bouquet (also called The Nosegay) | Unknown | G Lambert | 1920 | 1938 |
| HN407 | Omar Khayyam and the Beloved | Unknown | Charles J Noke | 1920 | 1938 |
| HN408 | Omar Khayyam (Style One) | Blue, green and brown | Charles J Noke | 1920 | 1938 |
| HN409 | Omar Khayyam (Style One) | Black and yellow | Charles J Noke | 1920 | 1938 |
| HN410 | Blue Beard (Without plume on turban) (Style One) | Green and blue | Ernest W Light | 1920 | 1938 |
| HN411 | A Lady of the Elizabethan Period (Style One) (also called Elizabethan Lady) | Purple | Ernest W Light | 1920 | 1938 |
| HN412 | A Jester (Style One) | Green and red | Charles J Noke | 1920 | 1938 |
| HN413 | The Crinoline | Light blue and lemon | G Lambert | 1920 | 1938 |
| HN414 | The Bouquet (also called The Nosegay) | Pink and yellow | G Lambert | 1920 | 1938 |
| HN415 | A Moorish Minstrel | Green and yellow | Charles J Noke | 1920 | 1938 |
| HN416 | Moorish Piper Minstrel | Green and yellow stripes | Charles J Noke | 1920 | 1938 |
| HN417 | One of the Forty (Style One) | Green and blue | Harry Tittensor | 1920 | 1938 |
| HN418 | One of the Forty (Style Two) | Stripe green robes | Harry Tittensor | 1920 | 1938 |
| HN419 | Omar Khayyam and the Beloved | Green and blue | Charles J Noke | 1920 | 1938 |
| HN420 | A Princess | Pink and green stripes skirt, blue cape | Unknown | 1920 | 1938 |
| HN421 | Contentment | Light green | Leslie Harradine | 1920 | 1938 |
| HN422 | The Bouquet (also called The Nosegay) | Yellow and pink | G Lambert | 1920 | 1938 |
| HN423 | One of the Forty (Style Three) | Varied | Harry Tittensor | 1921 | 1938 |
| HN423A | One of the Forty (Style Four) | Varied | Harry Tittensor | 1921 | 1938 |
| HN423B | One of the Forty (Style Five) | Varied | Harry Tittensor | 1921 | 1938 |
| HN423C | One of the Forty (Style Six) | Varied | Harry Tittensor | 1921 | 1938 |
| HN423D | One of the Forty (Style Seven) | Varied | Harry Tittensor | 1921 | 1938 |
| HN423E | One of the Forty (Style Eight) | Varied | Harry Tittensor | 1921 | 1938 |
| HN424 | Sleep | Blue | Phoebe Stabler | 1921 | 1938 |
| HN425 | The Goosegirl (Style One) | Blue | Harry Tittensor | 1921 | 1938 |
| HN426 | A Jester (Style One) | Pink and black | Charles J Noke | 1921 | 1938 |
| HN427 | One of the Forty (Style Nine) | Green | Harry Tittensor | 1921 | 1938 |
| HN428 | The Bouquet (also called The Nosegay) | Blue and green | G Lambert | 1920 | 1938 |
| HN429 | The Bouquet (also called The Nosegay) | Green and red | G Lambert | 1920 | 1938 |
| HN430 | A Princess | Green | Unknown | 1921 | 1938 |
| HN431 | A Princess | Yellow and white | Unknown | 1921 | 1938 |
| HN432 | Puff and Powder | Lavender and orange | Leslie Harradine | 1921 | 1938 |
| HN433 | Puff and Powder | Lilac and green | Leslie Harradine | 1921 | 1938 |
| HN434 | Marie (Style One) | Yellow and orange | Leslie Harradine | 1921 | 1938 |
| HN435 | Betty (Style One) | Blue and yellow | Leslie Harradine | 1921 | 1938 |
| HN436 | The Goosegirl (Style One) | Green and blue | Leslie Harradine | 1921 | 1938 |
| HN437 | The Goosegirl (Style One) | Brown and blue | Leslie Harradine | 1921 | 1938 |
| HN438 | Betty (Style One) | Green | Leslie Harradine | 1921 | 1938 |
| HN439 | Japanese Fan | Blue | Harry Tittensor | 1921 | 1938 |
| HN440 | Japanese Fan | Cream and orange | Harry Tittensor | 1921 | 1938 |
| HN441 | The Parson's Daughter | Yellow and orange | Harry Tittensor | 1921 | 1938 |
| HN442 | In Grandma's Days (also called The Poke Bonnet and A Lilac Shawl) | White and green | Charles J Noke | 1921 | 1938 |
| HN443 | Out for a Walk | Brown | Harry Tittensor | 1921 | 1936 |
| HN444 | A Lady of the Georgian Period | Turquoise | Ernest W Light | 1921 | 1938 |
| HN445 | Guy Fawkes | Green cloak | Charles J Noke | 1921 | 1938 |
| HN446 | A Jester (Style One) | Black, green, blue | Charles J Noke | 1921 | 1938 |
| HN447 | Lady With Shawl | Green and white striped dress | Leslie Harradine | 1921 | 1938 |
| HN448 | The Goosegirl (Style One) | Blue | Leslie Harradine | 1921 | 1938 |
| HN449 | Fruit Gathering | Blue | Leslie Harradine | 1921 | 1938 |
| HN450 | Chu Chin Chow | Red coat and green cap | Charles J Noke | 1921 | 1938 |
| HN451 | An Old Man | Unknown | Unknown | 1921 | 1938 |
| HN452 | No Figure | | | | |
| HN453 | The Gainsborough Hat | Red, blue and green | Harry Tittensor | 1921 | 1938 |
| HN454 | The Smiling Buddha | Green-blue | Charles J Noke | 1921 | 1938 |
| HN455 | A Mandarin (Style Two) | Green | Charles J Noke | 1921 | 1938 |
| HN456 | Myfanwy Jones (also called The Welsh Girl) | Green and brown | Ernest W Light | 1921 | 1938 |
| HN457 | Crouching Nude | Cream, green base | Unknown | 1921 | 1938 |
| HN458 | Lady With Shawl | Pink | Leslie Harradine | 1921 | 1938 |
| HN459 | Omar Khayyam and the Beloved | Multi-coloured | Charles J Noke | 1921 | 1938 |
| HN460 | Chu Chow Chin | Blue and green | Charles J Noke | 1921 | 1938 |
| HN461 | Chu Chow Chin | Blue | Charles J Noke | 1921 | 1938 |
| HN462 | Woman Holding Child | Green and white | Unknown | 1921 | 1938 |
| HN463 | Polly Peachum (Style One) | Pale blue | Leslie Harradine | 1921 | 1949 |
| HN464 | Captain MacHeath | Red, yellow and black | Leslie Harradine | 1921 | 1949 |
| HN465 | Polly Peachum (Style One) | Red | Leslie Harradine | 1921 | 1949 |
| HN466 | Tulips | Green | Unknown | 1921 | 1938 |
| HN467 | Doris Keene as Cavallini (Style One) | Dark green with gold jewellery | Charles J Noke | 1921 | 1938 |
| HN468 | Contentment | Green spotted dress | Leslie Harradine | 1921 | 1936 |
| HN469 | Dolly (Style Two) (also called Little Mother) | White | Harry Tittensor | 1921 | 1938 |
| HN470 | Lady and Blackamoor (Style Two) | Green and lavender | Harry Tittensor | 1921 | 1938 |
| HN471 | Katharine | Patterned green dress | Ernest W Light | 1921 | 1938 |
| HN472 | Spring (Style One) | Patterned yellow robe | Unknown | 1921 | 1938 |
| HN473 | Summer (Style One) | Patterned light green robes | Unknown | 1921 | 1938 |
| HN474 | Autumn (Style One) | Patterned pink robes | Unknown | 1921 | 1938 |
| HN475 | Winter (Style One) | Patterned pale green robes | Unknown | 1921 | 1938 |
| HN476 | Fruit Gathering | Green and blue | Leslie Harradine | 1921 | 1938 |
| HN477 | Betty (Style One) | Green | Leslie Harradine | 1921 | 1938 |
| HN478 | Betty (Style One) | White | Leslie Harradine | 1921 | 1938 |
| HN479 | The Balloon Seller (also called The Balloon Woman) | Blue and white | Leslie Harradine | 1921 | 1938 |
| HN480 | One of the Forty (Style Ten) | Brown, yellow and blue | Harry Tittensor | 1921 | 1938 |
| HN481 | One of the Forty (Style Eleven) | Dark colour | Harry Tittensor | 1921 | 1938 |
| HN482 | One of the Forty (Style Twelve) | White | Harry Tittensor | 1921 | 1938 |
| HN483 | One of the Forty (Style Eleven) | Brown and green | Harry Tittensor | 1921 | 1938 |
| HN484 | One of the Forty (Style Twelve) | Green | Harry Tittensor | 1921 | 1938 |
| HN485 | Lucy Locket (Style One) | Green | Leslie Harradine | 1921 | 1949 |
| HN486 | The Balloon Seller (also called The Balloon Woman) | Blue dress, no hat | Leslie Harradine | 1921 | 1938 |
| HN487 | Pavlova (also called Swan Song) | White, black base | Charles J Noke | 1921 | 1938 |
| HN488 | Tulips | Cream | Unknown | 1921 | 1938 |
| HN489 | Polly Peachum (Style Two) | Turquoise | Leslie Harradine | 1921 | 1938 |
| HN490 | One of the Forty (Style One) | Blue and brown | Harry Tittensor | 1921 | 1938 |
| HN491 | One of the Forty (Style Eleven) | Green and white | Harry Tittensor | 1921 | 1938 |
| HN492 | One of the Forty (Style Twelve) | Yellow and white | Harry Tittensor | 1921 | 1938 |
| HN493 | One of the Forty (Style Ten) | Blue and black | Harry Tittensor | 1921 | 1938 |
| HN494 | One of the Forty (Style Two) | White | Harry Tittensor | 1921 | 1938 |
| HN495 | One of the Forty (Style One) | Brown and blue | Harry Tittensor | 1921 | 1938 |
| HN496 | One of the Forty (Style Thirteen) | Orange and yellow checks | Harry Tittensor | 1921 | 1938 |
| HN497 | One of the Forty (Style Ten) | Brown and green | Harry Tittensor | 1921 | 1938 |
| HN498 | One of the Forty (Style Two) | Dark colours | Harry Tittensor | 1921 | 1938 |
| HN499 | One of the Forty (Style Ten) | Cream and green | Harry Tittensor | 1921 | 1938 |

== HN500 to 599 ==
| # | Title | Colour | Designer(s) | From | To |
|---|---|---|---|---|---|
| HN500 | One of the Forty (Style Thirteen) | Orange checks and red turban | Harry Tittensor | 1921 | 1938 |
| HN501 | One of the Forty (Style One) | Green stripes | Harry Tittensor | 1921 | 1938 |
| HN502 | Marie (Style One) | White, red and blue | Leslie Harradine | 1921 | 1938 |
| HN503 | Fruit Gathering | Brown and blue | Leslie Harradine | 1921 | 1938 |
| HN504 | Marie (Style One) | Green and blue | Leslie Harradine | 1921 | 1938 |
| HN505 | Marie (Style One) | Blue, green and lavender | Leslie Harradine | 1921 | 1938 |
| HN506 | Marie (Style One) | Blue, green and lavender | Leslie Harradine | 1921 | 1938 |
| HN507 | Pussy (also called The Black Cat) | Spotted blue dress | F C Stone | 1921 | 1938 |
| HN508 | An Orange Vendor | Purple | Charles J Noke | 1921 | 1938 |
| HN509 | Lady of the Fan | Green and lavender | Ernest W Light | 1921 | 1938 |
| HN510 | A Child's Grace | Green and yellow | Lawrence Perugini | 1921 | 1938 |
| HN511 | Upon Her Cheeks She Wept | Lavender | Lawrence Perugini | 1921 | 1938 |
| HN512 | A Spook | Blue | Harry Tittensor | 1921 | 1938 |
| HN513 | Picardy Peasant (woman) | Blue | Pheobe Stabler | 1921 | 1938 |
| HN514 | Myfanmy Jones (also called The Welsh Girl) | Green and red | Ernest W Light | 1921 | 1938 |
| HN515 | Lady With Rose | Lavender, green | Ernest W Light | 1921 | 1938 |
| HN516 | Myfanmy Jones (also called The Welsh Girl) | Black and lavender | Ernest W Light | 1921 | 1938 |
| HN517 | Lady With Rose | Lavender with orange spots | Ernest W Light | 1921 | 1938 |
| HN518 | The Curtsey | Lavender | Ernest W Light | 1921 | 1938 |
| HN519 | Myfanmy Jones (also called The Welsh Girl) | Blue and lavender | Ernest W Light | 1921 | 1938 |
| HN520 | Myfanmy Jones (also called The Welsh Girl) | Blue and lavender | Ernest W Light | 1921 | 1938 |
| HN521 | The Orange Vendor | Light blue | Charles J Noke | 1921 | 1938 |
| HN522 | Upon Her Cheeks She Wept | Lavender | Lawrence Perugini | 1921 | 1938 |
| HN523 | Sentinel | Red, blue and black | Unknown | 1921 | 1938 |
| HN524 | Lucy Locket (Style One) | Orange | Leslie Harradine | 1921 | 1949 |
| HN525 | The Flower Seller's Children | Green and blue | Leslie Harradine | 1921 | 1949 |
| HN526 | The Beggar (Style One) | Green and blue | Leslie Harradine | 1921 | 1949 |
| HN527 | The Highwayman | Green and red | Leslie Harradine | 1921 | 1949 |
| HN528 | One of the Forty (Style One) | Brown | Harry Tittensor | 1921 | 1938 |
| HN529 | Mr. Pickwick (Style One) | Black and tan | Leslie Harradine | 1922 | 1932 |
| HN530 | Fat Boy (Style One) | Blue and white | Leslie Harradine | 1922 | 1932 |
| HN531 | Sam Weller | Yellow and brown | Leslie Harradine | 1922 | 1932 |
| HN532 | Mr. Micawber | Tan and black | Leslie Harradine | 1922 | 1932 |
| HN533 | Sairey Gamp | Light and dark green | Leslie Harradine | 1922 | 1932 |
| HN534 | Fagin | Dark brown | Leslie Harradine | 1922 | 1932 |
| HN535 | Pecksniff (Style One) | Brown | Leslie Harradine | 1922 | 1932 |
| HN536 | Stiggins | Black | Leslie Harradine | 1922 | 1932 |
| HN537 | Bill Sykes | Black and brown | Leslie Harradine | 1922 | 1932 |
| HN538 | Buz Fuz | Black and brown | Leslie Harradine | 1922 | 1932 |
| HN539 | Tiny Tim | Black, brown and blue | Leslie Harradine | 1922 | 1932 |
| HN540 | Little Nell | Pink | Leslie Harradine | 1922 | 1932 |
| HN541 | Alfred Juingle | Brown and black | Leslie Harradine | 1922 | 1932 |
| HN542 | The Cobbler (Style One) | | Charles J Noke | 1922 | 1939 |
| HN543 | The Cobbler (Style One) | | Charles J Noke | 1922 | 1938 |
| HN544 | Tony Weller (Style Two) | | Leslie Harradine | 1922 | 1932 |
| HN545 | Uriah Heep (Style One) | | Leslie Harradine | 1922 | 1932 |
| HN546 | Artful Dodger | | Leslie Harradine | 1922 | 1932 |
| HN547 | The Curtsy | | Ernest W Light | 1922 | 1938 |
| HN548 | The Balloon Seller | | Leslie Harradine | 1922 | 1938 |
| HN549 | Polly Peachum (Style Two) | | Leslie Harradine | 1922 | 1949 |
| HN550 | Polly Peachum (Style One) | | Leslie Harradine | 1922 | 1949 |
| HN551 | The Flower Seller's Children | | Leslie Harradine | 1922 | 1949 |
| HN552 | A Jester (Style One) | | Charles J Noke | 1922 | 1938 |
| HN553 | Pecksniff (Style Two) | | Leslie Harradine | 1923 | 1939 |
| HN554 | Uriah Heep (Style Two) | | Leslie Harradine | 1923 | 1939 |
| HN555 | Fat Boy (Style Two) | | Leslie Harradine | 1923 | 1939 |
| HN556 | Mr. Pickwick (Style Two) | | Leslie Harradine | 1923 | 1939 |
| HN557 | Mr. Micawber (Style Two) | | Leslie Harradine | 1923 | 1939 |
| HN558 | Sairey Gamp (Style Two) | | Leslie Harradine | 1923 | 1939 |
| HN559 | The Goosegirl (Style One) | Pink | Leslie Harradine | 1923 | 1938 |
| HN560 | The Goosegirl (Style One) | Pink and white | Leslie Harradine | 1923 | 1938 |
| HN561 | Fruit Gathering | | Leslie Harradine | 1923 | 1938 |
| HN562 | Fruit Gathering | | Leslie Harradine | 1923 | 1938 |
| HN563 | Man in Tudor Costume | | Unknown | 1923 | 1938 |
| HN564 | The Parson's Daughter | | Harry Tittensor | 1923 | 1949 |
| HN565 | Pretty Lady | | Harry Tittensor | 1923 | 1938 |
| HN566 | The Crinoline | | George Lambert | 1923 | 1938 |
| HN567 | The Bouquet | | George Lambert | 1923 | 1938 |
| HN568 | Shy Anne | | Lawrence Perugini | 1923 | 1938 |
| HN569 | The Lavender Woman | | Pheobe Stabler | 1924 | 1936 |
| HN570 | Motherhood | | Unknown | 1923 | 1938 |
| HN571 | Falstaff (Style One) | | Charles J Noke | 1923 | 1938 |
| HN572 | Contentment | | Leslie Harradine | 1923 | 1938 |
| HN573 | Madonna of the Square | | Pheobe Stabler | 1923 | 1938 |
| HN574 | No Figure | | | | |
| HN575 | Falstaff (Style One) | | Charles J Noke | 1923 | 1938 |
| HN576 | Madonna of the Square | | Pheobe Stabler | 1923 | 1938 |
| HN577 | The Chelsea Pair (Woman) | | Leslie Harradine | 1923 | 1938 |
| HN578 | The Chelsea Pair (Woman) | | Leslie Harradine | 1923 | 1938 |
| HN579 | The Chelsea Pair (Man) | | Leslie Harradine | 1923 | 1938 |
| HN580 | The Chelsea Pair (Man) | | Leslie Harradine | 1923 | 1938 |
| HN581 | The Perfect Pair | | Leslie Harradine | 1923 | 1938 |
| HN582 | Grossmith's 'Tsang Ihang' Perfume of Thibet | | Unknown | 1921 | Unknown |
| HN583 | The Balloon Seller | | Leslie Harradine | 1923 | 1949 |
| HN584 | Lady With Rose | | Ernest W Light | 1923 | 1938 |
| HN585 | Harlequinade | | Leslie Harradine | 1923 | 1938 |
| HN586 | Boy With Turban | | Leslie Harradine | 1923 | 1938 |
| HN587 | Boy With Turban | Green / Red with Blue and Black Striped White Turban | Leslie Harradine | 1923 | 1938 |
| HN588 | Girl With Yellow Frock (Spring) | | Unknown | 1923 | 1938 |
| HN589 | Polly Peachum (Style One) | | Leslie Harradine | 1924 | 1949 |
| HN590 | Captain MacHeath | | Leslie Harradine | 1924 | 1949 |
| HN591 | The Beggar (Style One) | | Leslie Harradine | 1924 | 1949 |
| HN592 | The Highwayman | | Leslie Harradine | 1924 | 1949 |
| HN593 | Nude on Rock | | Unknown | 1924 | 1938 |
| HN594 | Madonna of the Square | | Phoebe Stabler | 1924 | 1938 |
| HN595 | Grief | | Charles J Noke | 1922 | 1938 |
| HN596 | Despair | | Charles J Noke | Unknown | Unknown |
| HN596 | Despair | | Charles J Noke | 1924 | 1938 |
| HN597 | The Bather (Style One) | | Leslie Harradine | 1924 | 1938 |
| HN598 | Omar Khayyan and the Beloved | | Charles J Noke | 1924 | 1938 |
| HN599 | Masquerade (Man) (Style One) | | Leslie Harradine | 1924 | 1949 |

== HN600 to 699 ==
| # | Title | Designer(s) | From | To |
|---|---|---|---|---|
| HN600 | Masquerade (Woman) | | | |
| HN601 | A Mandarin | | | |
| HN602 | | | | |
| HN603 | A Child of Study (Style One) | | | |
| HN603B | A Child of Study | | 1924 | 1938 |
| HN604 | A Child of Study (Style Two) | | | |
| HN605 | A Child of Study (Style Three) | | | |
| HN606 | Female Study | | | |
| HN607 | | | | |
| HN608 | Falstaff | | | |
| HN609 | | | | |
| HN610 | Henry Lytton as Jack Point | Charles Noke | 1924 | 1949 |
| HN611 | | | | |
| HN612 | The Poke Bonnet | | | |
| HN613 | | | | |
| HN614 | | | | |
| HN615 | Katharine | | | |
| HN616 | A Jester (Black&White - Chess color) | Charles J Noke | 1924 | 1938 |
| HN617 | A Shepherd | | | |
| HN618 | | | | |
| HN619 | | | | |
| HN620 | | | | |
| HN621 | Pan on Rock | | | |
| HN622 | | | | |
| HN623 | An Old King | | | |
| HN624 | | | | |
| HN625 | A Spook | H. Tittensor | | |
| HN626 | Lady With Shawl | | | |
| HN627 | | | | |
| HN628 | The Crinoline | | | |
| HN629 | | | | |
| HN630 | | | | |
| HN631 | | | | |
| HN632 | | | | |
| HN633 | | | | |
| HN634 | Japanese Lady | H. Tittensor | 1924 | 1936 |
| HN635 | Harlequinade - Gold Variation | | | |
| HN636 | | | | |
| HN637 | | | | |
| HN638 | | | | |
| HN639 | Elsie Maynard | | | |
| HN640 | Charly's Aunt | | | |
| HN641 | | | | |
| HN642 | Pierrette | | | |
| HN643 | | | | |
| HN644 | Pierrette (white, black accents) | Leslie Harradine | 1924 | 1938 |
| HN645 | | | | |
| HN646 | | | | |
| HN647 | | | | |
| HN648 | | | | |
| HN649 | | | | |
| HN650 | Crinoline Lady | | | |
| HN651 | | | | |
| HN652 | | | | |
| HN653 | | | | |
| HN654 | Crinoline Lady | | | |
| HN655 | | | | |
| HN656 | The Mask | Leslie Harradine | 1924 | 1938 |
| HN657 | The Mask | Leslie Harradine | 1924 | 1938 |
| HN658 | Mam'selle | | | |
| HN659 | Mam'selle (blue) | Leslie Harradine | 1924 | 1938 |
| HN660 | | | | |
| HN661 | | | | |
| HN662 | | | | |
| HN663 | | | | |
| HN664 | | | | |
| HN665 | | | | |
| HN666 | | | | |
| HN667 | | | | |
| HN668 | | | | |
| HN669 | | | | |
| HN670 | | | | |
| HN671 | The Ermine Muff | | | |
| HN672 | Tulips | | | |
| HN673 | Henr VIII | | | |
| HN674 | | | | |
| HN675 | | | | |
| HN676 | Pavlova | | | |
| HN677 | | | | |
| HN678 | | | | |
| HN679 | | | | |
| HN680 | | | | |
| HN681 | | | | |
| HN682 | The Cobbler (Style One) | Charles J Noke | 1924 | 1938 |
| HN684 | | | | |
| HN685 | | | | |
| HN686 | | | | |
| HN687 | | | | |
| HN688 | A Yeoman of the Guard | Leslie Harradine | 1924 | 1938 |
| HN689 | A Chelsea Pensioner | Leslie Harradine | 1924 | 1938 |
| HN690 | A Lady of the Georgian Period | | | |
| HN691 | | | | |
| HN692 | Sleep | | | |
| HN693 | | | | |
| HN694 | | | | |
| HN695 | | | | |
| HN696 | | | | |
| HN698 | | | | |
| HN699 | unknown name/unmarked | Woman in pink dress, white hat | | |

== HN700 to 799 ==
| # | Title | Designer(s) | From | To |
|---|---|---|---|---|
| HN700 | | | | |
| HN701 | | | | |
| HN702 | | | | |
| HN703 | | | | |
| HN704 | | | | |
| HN705 | | | | |
| HN706 | | | | |
| HN707 | | | | |
| HN708 | Sheepherdess | | | |
| HN709 | | | | |
| HN710 | Sleep | | | |
| HN711 | | | | |
| HN712 | One of the Forty (red, black) | H. Tittensor | 1925 | 1938 |
| HN713 | | | | |
| HN714 | | | | |
| HN715 | Proposal (Woman) Red Dress | Leslie Harradine | 1925 | 1940 |
| HN716 | Proposal (Woman) White Dress | Leslie Harradine | 1925 | 1940 |
| HN717 | Lady Clown | | | |
| HN718 | | | | |
| HN719 | Butterfly | Leslie Harradine | 1925 | 1940 |
| HN720 | Butterfly | Leslie Harradine | 1925 | 1940 |
| HN721 | Pierrette | | | |
| HN722 | Mephisto | | | |
| HN723 | | | | |
| HN724 | Mam'selle | | | |
| HN725 | The Proposal Man | Leslie Harradine | 1925 | 1938 |
| HN726 | A Victorian Lady | Leslie Harradine | 1925 | 1938 |
| HN727 | A Victorian Lady (pink, green colourway) | Leslie Harradine | 1925 | 1938 |
| HN728 | A Victorian Lady (pink, purple colourway) | Leslie Harradine | 1925 | 1952 |
| HN729 | The Mask | | | |
| HN730 | Butterfly | | | |
| HN731 | | | | |
| HN732 | | | | |
| HN733 | | | | |
| HN734 | | | | |
| HN735 | Shepherdess | Leslie Harradine | 1925 | 1938 |
| HN736 | | | | |
| HN737 | | | | |
| HN738 | | | | |
| HN739 | | | | |
| HN740 | | | | |
| HN741 | | | | |
| HN742 | | | | |
| HN743 | | | | |
| HN744 | | | | |
| HN745 | | | | |
| HN746 | | | | |
| HN747 | | | | |
| HN748 | Out for a Walk | | | |
| HN749 | London Cry, Strawberries | Leslie Harradine | 1925 | 1930 |
| HN750 | | | | |
| HN751 | Shepherd | Leslie Harradine | 1925 | 1938 |
| HN752 | London Cry | Leslie Harradine | 1925 | 1938 |
| HN753 | The Dandy | Leslie Harradine | 1925 | 1936 |
| HN754 | The Belle | | | |
| HN755 | Mephistopheles and Marguerite | | | |
| HN756 | The Modern Piper | | 1925 | 1940 |
| HN757 | | | | |
| HN758 | | | | |
| HN759 | | | | |
| HN760 | | | | |
| HN761 | | | | |
| HN762 | | | | |
| HN763 | | | | |
| HN764 | | | | |
| HN765 | | | | |
| HN766 | Irish Collen | | | |
| HN767 | | | | |
| HN768 | Harlequinade Masked | | | |
| HN769 | | | | |
| HN770 | | | | |
| HN771 | London Cry, Turnips and Carrots | | | |
| HN772 | London Cry, Strawberries | Leslie Harradine | 1925 | 1936 |
| HN773 | The Bather | Leslie Harradine | 1925 | 1938 |
| HN774 | | | | |
| HN775 | | | | |
| HN776 | | | | |
| HN777 | Bo-Peep | | | |
| HN778 | Captain | | | |
| HN779 | Geisha | | | |
| HN780 | | | | |
| HN781 | | | | |
| HN782 | | | | |
| HN783 | | | | |
| HN784 | | | | |
| HN785 | | | | |
| HN786 | | | | |
| HN787 | | | | |
| HN788 | | | | |
| HN789 | The Flower Seller | | | |
| HN790 | The Parson's Daughter | | | |
| HN791 | | | | |
| HN792 | | | | |
| HN793 | | | | |
| HN794 | | | | |
| HN795 | | | | |
| HN796 | | | | |
| HN797 | Moorish Minstrel | C. J. Noke | 1926 | 1949 |
| HN798 | Tete-a-Tete (blue dress, red coat, 5.75" tall) | Leslie Harradine | 1926 | 1938 |
| HN799 | Tete-a-Tete (blue dress, 5.75" tall) | Leslie Harradine | 1926 | 1940 |

== HN800 to 899 ==
| # | Title | Designer(s) | From | To |
|---|---|---|---|---|
| HN800 | | | | |
| HN801 | Pig, Snoozing (sm 1.25"H, 4"L) | | | |
| HN802 | | | | |
| HN803 | | | | |
| HN804 | Bonzo (laying pup, 2.5") | Charles J Noke | | |
| HN805 | | | | |
| HN805B | Bonzo (small mouth) | Charles Noke | | |
| HN806 | Duck (white) | | 1923 | 1968 |
| HN807 | Mallard Drake | | | |
| HN808 | | | | |
| HN809 | Pig snoozing (small) | | | |
| HN810 | | | | |
| HN811 | | | | |
| HN812 | | | | |
| HN813 | | | | |
| HN814 | | | | |
| HN815 | | | | |
| HN816 | | | | |
| HN817 | | | | |
| HN818 | | | | |
| HN819 | | | | |
| HN820 | | | | |
| HN821 | | | | |
| HN822 | | | | |
| HN823 | | | | |
| HN824 | | | | |
| HN825 | | | | |
| HN826 | | | | |
| HN827 | | | | |
| HN828 | | | | |
| HN829 | | | | |
| HN830 | | | | |
| HN831 | Beagle puppy sitting | Unknown | 1923 | 1946 |
| HN832 | Pekinese Puppy Seated | | 1923 | 1946 |
| HN833 | | | | |
| HN834 | | | | |
| HN835 | | | | |
| HN836 | | | | |
| HN837 | | | | |
| HN838 | | | | |
| HN839 | | | | |
| HN840 | | | | |
| HN841 | | | | |
| HN842 | | | | |
| HN843 | | | | |
| HN844 | | | | |
| HN845 | | | | |
| HN846 | | | | |
| HN847 | | | | |
| HN848 | | | | |
| HN849 | | | | |
| HN850 | | | | |
| HN851 | | | | |
| HN852 | | | | |
| HN853 | | | | |
| HN854 | | | | |
| HN855 | | | | |
| HN856 | | | | |
| HN857 | | | | |
| HN858 | | | | |
| HN859 | | | | |
| HN860 | | | | |
| HN861 | | | | |
| HN862 | | | | |
| HN863 | | | | |
| HN864 | | | | |
| HN865 | | | | |
| HN866 | | | | |
| HN867 | | | | |
| HN868 | | | | |
| HN869 | | | | |
| HN870 | | | | |
| HN871 | | | | |
| HN872 | | | | |
| HN873 | | | | |
| HN874 | | | | |
| HN875 | | | | |
| HN876 | | | | |
| HN877 | | | | |
| HN878 | | | | |
| HN879 | | | | |
| HN880 | Cockerel, Seated | Unknown | 1924 | 1936 |
| HN881 | Bulldog, sitting (small, various colors) | Unknown | 1938 | 1946 |
| HN882 | | | | |
| HN883 | | | | |
| HN884 | | | | |
| HN885 | | | | |
| HN886 | | | | |
| HN887 | | | | |
| HN888 | | | | |
| HN889 | | | | |
| HN890 | | | | |
| HN891 | Trunk in Salute (Flambe Elephant) | Charles J. Noke | 1920 | 1930 |
| HN892 | | | | |
| HN893 | | | | |
| HN894 | | | | |
| HN895 | | | | |
| HN896 | | | | |
| HN897 | | | | |
| HN898 | | | | |
| HN899 | Alsatian seated | | 1926 | 1946 |

== HN900 to 999 ==
| # | Title | Designer(s) | From | To |
|---|---|---|---|---|
| HN900 | | | | |
| HN901 | | | | |
| HN902 | | | | |
| HN903 | | | | |
| HN904 | | | | |
| HN905 | | | | |
| HN906 | | | | |
| HN907 | | | | |
| HN908 | | | | |
| HN909 | | | | |
| HN910 | | | | |
| HN911 | | | | |
| HN912 | | | | |
| HN913 | | | | |
| HN914 | | | | |
| HN915 | | | | |
| HN916 | | | | |
| HN917 | | | | |
| HN918 | | | | |
| HN919 | | | | |
| HN920 | Two Foxes Curled, Style Two (6.5"W x 3.5"H) | Charles Noke | 1927 | 1946 |
| HN921 | Flambe Alsatian, Seated (8" H) | Charles Noke | | |
| HN922 | | | | |
| HN923 | | | | |
| HN924 | | | | |
| HN925 | | | | |
| HN926 | Two Curled Foxes, Style three | | 1927 | |
| HN927 | | | | |
| HN928 | | | | |
| HN929 | | | | |
| HN930 | | | | |
| HN931 | Fox Terrier Pup Sitting | | 1927 | 1946 |
| HN932 | | | | |
| HN933 | | | | |
| HN934 | | | | |
| HN935 | | | | |
| HN936 | | | | |
| HN937 | | | | |
| HN938 | | | | |
| HN939 | | | | |
| HN940 | Bears Drinking | | 1927 | 1936 |
| HN941 | | | | |
| HN942 | | | | |
| HN943 | | | | |
| HN944 | Fox Terrier standing | | 1927 | 1936 |
| HN945 | Fox Terrier, standing, head to right | | 1927 | 1940 |
| HN946 | Large Peruvian Penguin | | | |
| HN947 | | | | |
| HN948 | Bulldog, brown, sitting | Unknown | 1927 | 1946 |
| HN949 | | | | |
| HN950 | | | | |
| HN951 | | | | |
| HN952 | | | | |
| HN953 | | | | |
| HN954 | | | | |
| HN955 | | | | |
| HN956 | Flambe Mallard Drake Standing | Charles J Noke | 1913 | 1996 |
| HN957 | Spaniel, sitting, liver and white | | 1928 | 1946 |
| HN958 | | | | |
| HN959 | | | | |
| HN960 | | | | |
| HN961 | | | | |
| HN962 | | | | |
| HN963 | | | | |
| HN964 | | | | |
| HN965 | | | | |
| HN966 | Large elephant trunk in salute | Charles Noke | 1926 | 1962 |
| HN967 | Seated Cat #9 | Charles Noke | 1920 | 1996 |
| HN968 | | | | |
| HN969 | | | | |
| HN970 | | | | |
| HN971 | | | | |
| HN972 | | | | |
| HN973 | | | | |
| HN974 | | | | |
| HN975 | English Setter B/W (field), sitting w/collar | | 1930 | 1946 |
| HN976 | | | | |
| HN977 | | | | |
| HN978 | Red Fox - Curled - Style Two | | 1930 | 1946 |
| HN979 | | | | |
| HN980 | | | | |
| HN981 | | | | |
| HN982 | | | | |
| HN983 | | | | |
| HN984 | | | | |
| HN985 | | | | |
| HN986 | | | | |
| HN987 | | | | |
| HN988 | | | | |
| HN989 | | | | |
| HN990 | | | | |
| HN991 | | | | |
| HN992 | Scottish Terrier play bow | | 1930 | 1946 |
| HN993 | | | | |
| HN994 | | | | |
| HN995 | | | | |
| HN996 | | | | |
| HN997 | | | | |
| HN998 | | | | |
| HN999 | Black and White Cat | | | |

== HN1000 to 1099 ==
| # | Title | Designer(s) | From | To |
|---|---|---|---|---|
| HN1000 | Cocker Spaniel "CH Lucky Star of Ware" (Black,6.5") | Frederick Daws | 1931 | 1960 |
| HN1001 | | | | |
| HN1002 | Cocker Spaniel (liver / white) | Frederick Daws | 1931 | 1960 |
| HN1003 | | | | |
| HN1004 | | | | |
| HN1005 | | | | |
| HN1006 | | | | |
| HN1007 | Wirehair Fox Terrier (Large) | Frederick Daws | 1931 | 1955 |
| HN1008 | Scottish terrier "Albourne Arthur" | | 1931 | 1955 |
| HN1009 | | | | |
| HN1010 | | | | |
| HN1011 | Pekinese "Ch Biddee of Ifield" (6.5" high) | Frederick Daws | 1931 | 1955 |
| HN1012 | Pekinese "Ch Biddee of Ifield" (standing, 3" tall) | Frederick Daws | 1931 | 1977 |
| HN1013 | Wirehair Fox Terrier (Medium) | Frederick Daws | 1931 | 1960 |
| HN1014 | Wirehair Fox Terrier (Small) | Frederick Daws | 1931 | 1985 |
| HN1015 | Scottish Terrier (lg) | Frederick Daws | 1931 | 1960 |
| HN1016 | Scottish Terrier (med) | Frederick Daws | 1931 | 1985 |
| HN1017 | | | | |
| HN1018 | | | | |
| HN1019 | | | | |
| HN1020 | Cocker Spaniel "CH Lucky Star of Ware" (med) | Frederick Daws | 1931 | 1985 |
| HN1021 | Cocker Spaniel "CH Lucky Star of Ware" (sm) | Frederick Daws | 1931 | |
| HN1022 | Airedale Terrier "CH Cotsford Topsail" (Large) | Frederick Daws | 1931 | 1960 |
| HN1023 | Airedale Terrier "CH Cotsford Topsail" (Medium) | Frederick Daws | 1931 | 1985 |
| HN1024 | Airedale Terrier "CH Cotsford Topsail" (Small) | Frederick Daws | 1931 | 1959 |
| HN1025 | English Foxhound "CH Tring Rattler" (7.25" H) | | | |
| HN1026 | English Foxhound "CH Tring Rattler" (Med) | Frederick Daws | 1931 | 1960 |
| HN1027 | English Foxhound "CH Tring Rattler" (Sm 4" H) | Frederick Daws | 1931 | 1956 |
| HN1028 | Springer Spaniel with Pheasant | | | |
| HN1029 | Cocker Spaniel with Pheasant (sm) | | 1931 | 1968 |
| HN1030 | Sealyham Terrier Standing (Large) | Frederick Daws | 1931 | 1955 |
| HN1031 | Sealyham Terrier Standing (Medium) | Frederick Daws | 1931 | 1955 |
| HN1032 | Sealyham Terrier Standing (Small) | Frederick Daws | 1931 | 1960 |
| HN1033 | Cairn Terrier CH 'Charming Eyes' (7"H Lrg) | Frederick Daws | 1931 | 1955 |
| HN1034 | Cairn Terrier CH 'Charming Eyes' (Med) | | | |
| HN1035 | | | | |
| HN1036 | Cocker Spaniel (white, red, 5" tall) | Frederick Daws | 1931 | 1985 |
| HN1037 | Cocker Spaniel (white, red, 3.5" tall) | | | 1969 |
| HN1038 | | | | |
| HN1039 | | | | |
| HN1040 | Pekenese "CH Biddee of Ifield" (sitting, 3" tall) | Frederick Daws | 1931 | 1946 |
| HN1041 | | | | |
| HN1042 | Standing Bulldog, Brindle (Large, 5.5" tall) | Fredrick Daws | 1931 | 1960 |
| HN1043 | | | | |
| HN1044 | Bulldog Brindle Standing | Frederick Daws | 1931 | 1968 |
| HN1045 | | | | |
| HN1046 | Bulldog brindle with collar standind (4.5" high) | | | |
| HN1047 | | | | |
| HN1048 | | | | |
| HN1049 | English Setter "CH Maesydd Mustard" (lg) | Frederick Daws | 1931 | 1960 |
| HN1050 | English Setter "CH Maesydd Mustard" (med) | Frederick Daws | 1931 | |
| HN1051 | English Setter "CH Maesydd Mustard" (sm) | Frederick Daws | 1931 | 1968 |
| HN1052 | | | | |
| HN1053 | | | | |
| HN1054 | Irish Setter "CH Pat O Moy" (lrg, 12") | | 1931 | 1960 |
| HN1055 | Irish Setter "CH Pat O Moy" (med, 5.5" high) | Frederick Daws | 1931 | 1985 |
| HN1056 | Irish Setter "CH Pat O Moy" (sm) | | | |
| HN1057 | Collie "CH. Ashtead Applause" (large) | Frederick Daws | 1931 | 1960 |
| HN1058 | Collie "CH. Ashtead Applause" (Medium) | Frederick Daws | 1931 | 1985 |
| HN1059 | Collie "CH. Ashtead Applause" (Small) | Frederick Daws | 1931 | 1969 |
| HN1060 | | | | |
| HN1061 | | | | |
| HN1062 | Spaniel with Pheasant (sm) | | | |
| HN1063 | | | | |
| HN1064 | | | | |
| HN1065 | | | | |
| HN1066 | | | | |
| HN1067 | Greyhound (fawn, 4.5", sm) | | 1931 | 1960 |
| HN1068 | | | | |
| HN1069 | Smooth Fox Terrier "CH Chosen of Don Notts" (6" tall - Lg) | Frederick Daws | 1932 | 1960 |
| HN1070 | Smooth Fox Terrier "CH Chosen of Don Notts" (4.5" tall - Med) | Frederick Daws | | |
| HN1071 | | | | |
| HN1072 | | | | |
| HN1073 | | | | |
| HN1074 | Bulldog standing with collar | | | |
| HN1075 | Greyhound (Large) | | 1932 | 1955 |
| HN1076 | Greyhound (White, 6" tall, Med) | | 1932 | 1955 |
| HN1077 | Greyhound (White, 4.5" tall, sm) | | 1932 | 1955 |
| HN1078 | | | | |
| HN1079 | Gordon Setter (large) | Frederick Daws | 1932 | 1955 |
| HN1080 | | | | |
| HN1081 | Gordon Setter | Frederick Daws | | |
| HN1082 | Flambe Stalking Tiger (style 2) (large) | Charles J Noke | 1950 | 1996 |
| HN1083 | | | | |
| HN1084 | | | | |
| HN1085 | | | | |
| HN1086 | | | | |
| HN1087 | | | | |
| HN1088 | | | | |
| HN1089 | | | | |
| HN1090 | | | | |
| HN1091 | | | | |
| HN1092 | | | | |
| HN1093 | | | | |
| HN1094 | | | | |
| HN1095 | | | | |
| HN1096 | Fox with Stolen Goose (cape, hat) | Charles Noke | 1934 | 1946 |
| HN1097 | Terrier with ball | | | |
| HN1098 | Jack Russell Terrier on back w/paws in air (4.5") | | | |
| HN1099 | Jack Russell Terrier yawning | | | |

== HN1100 to 1199 ==
| # | Title | Designer(s) | From | To |
|---|---|---|---|---|
| HN1100 | Bull Terrier Dog | | 1934 | 1959 |
| HN1101 | Character Dog Parson Russell Terrier Lying Down Panting | | | |
| HN1102 | Character Fox With Stolen Goose | | | |
| HN1103 | Puppy Dog Jack Russell Terrier Playing With Ball | | 1934 | 1985 |
| HN1104 | | | | |
| HN1105 | | | | |
| HN1106 | | | | |
| HN1107 | | | | |
| HN1108 | Cocker Spaniel (black / white) | Frederick Daws | 1937 | 1960 |
| HN1109 | Cocker Spaniel (med) | Frederick Daws | 1937 | 1985 |
| HN1110 | | | | |
| HN1111 | Dalmatian Ch. Goworth Victor | | | |
| HN1112 | | | | |
| HN1113 | Dalmatian Ch. Goworth Victor | | | |
| HN1114 | Dalmatian Ch. Goworth Victor | | | |
| HN1115 | German Shepherd Dog Bening of Picardy (Large) | Frederick Daws | 1937 | 1960 |
| HN1116 | German Shepherd Dog Bening of Picardy (Med) | Frederick Daws | 1937 | 1985 |
| HN1117 | German Shepherd Dog Bening of Picardy (Small) | Frederick Daws | 1937 | 1968 |
| HN1118 | | | | |
| HN1119 | | | | |
| HN1120 | | | | |
| HN1121 | | | | |
| HN1122 | | | | |
| HN1123 | | | | |
| HN1124 | | | | |
| HN1125 | | | | |
| HN1126 | | | | |
| HN1127 | Dachshund "CH Shrewd Saint" (6" H) | Frederick Daws | 1937 | 1955 |
| HN1128 | Dachshund | | | |
| HN1129 | | | | |
| HN1130 | | | | |
| HN1131 | Gloria | | | |
| HN1132 | White Bull Terrier (Medium, 6.25" high) | | | |
| HN1133 | Cairn Terrier (Large) | Frederick Daws | 1931 | 1955 |
| HN1134 | Cairn Terrier (Medium) | Frederick Daws | 1931 | 1960 |
| HN1135 | Cairn Terrier (Small) | Frederick Daws | 1931 | 1985 |
| HN1136 | | | | |
| HN1137 | Cocker Spaniel With Pheasant (Large) | | 1937 | 1968 |
| HN1138 | Cocker Spaniel With Pheasant (Medium) | | | |
| HN1139 | | | | |
| HN1140 | Dachshund Dog | | | |
| HN1141 | Dachshund | | | |
| HN1142 | | | | |
| HN1143 | Brindle Bull Terrier "Bokos Brock" | Frederick Daws | 1937 | 1960 |
| HN1144 | Brindle Bull Terrier "CH Bokos Brock" (Small) | Frederick Daws | 1937 | 1946 |
| HN1145 | | | | |
| HN1146 | | | | |
| HN1147 | | | | |
| HN1148 | | | | |
| HN1149 | | | | |
| HN1150 | | | | |
| HN1151 | | | | |
| HN1152 | | | | |
| HN1153 | | | | |
| HN1154 | | | | |
| HN1155 | Jack Russell Terrier Dog With Bone | | | |
| HN1156 | | | | |
| HN1157 | | | | |
| HN1158 | Jack Russell Terrier Dog Licking Plate | | | 1985 |
| HN1159 | Jack Russell Terrier Dog Holding Bone | | 1937 | 1985 |
| HN1160 | | | | |
| HN1161 | | | | |
| HN1162 | | | | |
| HN1163 | | | | |
| HN1163A | Two Chicks (black colourway) | Charles Noke | 1920 | 1946 |
| HN1164 | | | | |
| HN1165 | | | | |
| HN1166 | | | | |
| HN1167 | | | | |
| HN1168 | | | | |
| HN1169 | | | | |
| HN1170 | | | | |
| HN1171 | | | | |
| HN1172 | | | | |
| HN1173 | | | | |
| HN1174 | | | | |
| HN1175 | | | | |
| HN1176 | | | | |
| HN1177 | | | | |
| HN1178 | | | | |
| HN1179 | | | | |
| HN1180 | | | | |
| HN1181 | | | | |
| HN1182 | | | | |
| HN1183 | | | | |
| HN1184 | | | | |
| HN1185 | | | | |
| HN1186 | | | | |
| HN1187 | Cocker Spaniel Dog | Frederick Daws | 1937 | 1985 |
| HN1188 | Cocker Spaniel Dog Standing (red, 4.75" tall) | Frederick Daws | | |
| HN1189 | King Penguin | | 1937 | 1946 |
| HN1190 | Peruvian Penguin | | | |
| HN1191 | | | | |
| HN1192 | | | | |
| HN1193 | | | | |
| HN1194 | | | | |
| HN1195 | | | | |
| HN1196 | | | | |
| HN1197 | | | | |
| HN1198 | | | | |
| HN1199 | | | | |

== HN1200 to 1299 ==
| # | Title | Designer(s) | From | To |
|---|---|---|---|---|
| HN1200 | | | | |
| HN1201 | Hunts Lady | Leslie Harradine | 1926 | 1938 |
| HN1202 | Bo-Peep | | | |
| HN1203 | Butterfly | | | |
| HN1204 | Angela / Fanny (known by both names) | Leslie Harradine | 1936 | 1940 |
| HN1205 | Miss 1926 | | | |
| HN1206 | The Flower Seller's Children | | | |
| HN1207 | | | | |
| HN1208 | | | | |
| HN1209 | | | | |
| HN1210 | | | | |
| HN1211 | Quality Street | | 1926 | 1998 |
| HN1212 | | | | |
| HN1213 | | | | |
| HN1214 | | | | |
| HN1215 | The Pied Piper | | | |
| HN1216 | Falstaff | C.J. Noke | | |
| HN1217 | The Prince of Wales | Leslie Harradine | 1926 | 1938 |
| HN1218 | A Spook | | | |
| HN1219 | Negligee | Leslie Harradine | 1927 | 1936 |
| HN1220 | Lido Lady | Leslie Harradine | 1927 | 1936 |
| HN1221 | Lady Jester | Leslie Harradine | 1927 | 1938 |
| HN1222 | Lady Jester | Leslie Harradine | 1927 | 1938 |
| HN1223 | Geisha (green, red, blue, pink) | Charles J Noke | 1927 | 1938 |
| HN1224 | The Wandering Minstre | | | |
| HN1225 | | | | |
| HN1226 | The Huntsman | Leslie Harradine | 1927 | 1938 |
| HN1227 | The Bather | | | |
| HN1228 | Negligee | Leslie Harradine | 1927 | 1936 |
| HN1229 | Lido Lady | | | |
| HN1230 | Baba | | | |
| HN1231 | Cassim | Leslie Harradine | 1927 | 1938 |
| HN1232 | | | | |
| HN1233 | Susanna | | | |
| HN1234 | A Geisha (blue, red, green) | Charles J Noke | 1927 | 1938 |
| HN1235 | A Scribe | | | |
| HN1236 | Tete-a-Tete | Charles J. Noke | | |
| HN1237 | Tete-a-Tete 3" Miniature | Charles J. Noke | 1927 | 1938 |
| HN1238 | | | | |
| HN1239 | | | | |
| HN1240 | | | | |
| HN1241 | | | | |
| HN1242 | | | | |
| HN1243 | | | | |
| HN1244 | | | | |
| HN1245 | | | | |
| HN1246 | | | | |
| HN1247 | | | | |
| HN1248 | | | | |
| HN1249 | Circe | | | |
| HN1250 | | | | |
| HN1251 | The Cobbler | | | |
| HN1252 | Kathleen | Leslie Harradine | 1927 | 1938 |
| HN1253 | | | | |
| HN1254 | | | | |
| HN1255 | | | | |
| HN1256 | Captain MacHeath | | | |
| HN1257 | Highwayman | | | |
| HN1258 | A Victorian Lady | | 1927 | 1938 |
| HN1259 | The Alchemist | | | |
| HN1260 | Carnival | Leslie Harradine | 1927 | 1938 |
| HN1261 | Sea Sprite | | | |
| HN1262 | Spanish Lady | | | |
| HN1263 | Clownette | Leslie Harradine | 1927 | 1938 |
| HN1264 | Judge and Jury | JG Hughes | 1927 | 1938 |
| HN1265 | Lady Fayre | Leslie Harradine | 1928 | 1938 |
| HN1266 | Ko-Ko | | | |
| HN1267 | Carmen | Leslie Harradine | 1928 | 1938 |
| HN1268 | Yum-Yum | | | |
| HN1269 | Scotch Girl | | | |
| HN1270 | The Swimmer | | | |
| HN1271 | The Mask | | | |
| HN1272 | Negligee | | | |
| HN1273 | | | | |
| HN1274 | Harlequinade Masked | | | |
| HN1275 | Kathleen | | | |
| HN1276 | A Victorian Lady | | | |
| HN1277 | A Victorian Lady (colorway red shawl, yellow blue dress) | | 1928 | 1938 |
| HN1278 | | | | |
| HN1279 | Kathleen (red dress, dark blue hat and bow) | Leslie Harradine | 1928 | 1938 |
| HN1280 | Blue Bird | Leslie Harradine | 1927 | 1938 |
| HN1281 | Scotties | | | |
| HN1282 | The Alchemist | Leslie Harradine | 1927 | 1938 |
| HN1283 | The Cobbler, 2nd version | Charles J Noke | 1928 | 1949 |
| HN1284 | Lady Jester | | | |
| HN1285 | | | | |
| HN1286 | Ko Ko (Red colourway) | Leslie Harradine | 1938 | 1949 |
| HN1287 | | | | |
| HN1288 | Susanna | | | |
| HN1289 | Midinette | | | |
| HN1290 | Spanish Lady | | | |
| HN1291 | | | | |
| HN1292 | | | | |
| HN1293 | | | | |
| HN1294 | | | | |
| HN1295 | The Jester | Charles J Noke | 1928 | 1949 |
| HN1296 | Columbine | Leslie Harradine | 1928 | 1940 |
| HN1297 | | | | |
| HN1298 | Sweet and Twenty | Leslie Harradine | 1928 | 1969 |
| HN1299 | | | | |

== HN1300 to 1399 ==
| # | Title | Designer(s) | From | To |
|---|---|---|---|---|
| HN1300 | Carmen | | | |
| HN1301 | Young Mother With Child | | | |
| HN1302 | The Gleaner | | | |
| HN1303 | Angela | Leslie Harradine | 1928 | 1940 |
| HN1304 | Harlequinade Masked | | | |
| HN1305 | Siesta | | | |
| HN1306 | Midinette | | | |
| HN1307 | An Irishman | | | |
| HN1308 | The Moor | C.J. Noke | 1929 | 1938 |
| HN1309 | Spanish Lady | | | |
| HN1310 | A Geisha | Charles J. Noke | 1929 | 1938 |
| HN1311 | Cassim | | | |
| HN1312 | | | | |
| HN1313 | Sonny | | | |
| HN1314 | | | | |
| HN1315 | Old Balloon Seller | Leslie Harradine | 1929 | 1998 |
| HN1316 | Toys | | | |
| HN1317 | The Snake Charmer | Leslie Harradine | 1929 | 1938 |
| HN1318 | Sweet Anne | Leslie Harradine | 1929 | 1949 |
| HN1319 | Darling | C Vyse | 1929 | 1959 |
| HN1320 | Rosamund | Leslie Harradine | 1929 | 1937 |
| HN1321 | A Geisha | | | |
| HN1322 | | | | |
| HN1323 | Contentment (mother with child) | Leslie Harradine | 1929 | 1938 |
| HN1324 | Fairy | Leslie Harradine | | |
| HN1325 | The Orange Seller | | | |
| HN1326 | The Swimmer | | | |
| HN1327 | Bo-Peep | | | |
| HN1328 | | | | |
| HN1329 | | | | |
| HN1330 | Sweet Anne | Leslie Harradine | 1929 | 1949 |
| HN1331 | Sweet Anne | Leslie Harradine | 1929 | 1949 |
| HN1332 | Lady Jester | | | |
| HN1333 | A Jester | | | |
| HN1334 | Tulips | Unknown | 1929 | 1936 |
| HN1335 | Folly | Leslie Harradine | 1929 | 1938 |
| HN1336 | | | | |
| HN1337 | Priscilla | Leslie Harradine | 1929 | 1938 |
| HN1338 | The Courtier | Leslie Harradine | 1929 | 1938 |
| HN1339 | Covent Garden | | | |
| HN1340 | Priscilla | Leslie Harradine | 1929 | 1949 |
| HN1341 | Marietta | | | |
| HN1342 | Flower Seller's Children | Leslie Harradine | 1929 | 1993 |
| HN1343 | Dulcinea | | | |
| HN1344 | Sunshine Girl | | | |
| HN1345 | A Victorian Lady | Leslie Harradine | 1929 | 1949 |
| HN1346 | Iona | | | |
| HN1347 | Moira | | | |
| HN1348 | Sunshine Girl | Leslie Harradine | 1929 | 1938 |
| HN1349 | Scotties | Leslie Harradine | 1926 | 1936 |
| HN1350 | One of the Forty | Harry Tittensor | | |
| HN1351 | | | | |
| HN1352 | | | | |
| HN1353 | | | | |
| HN1354 | | | | |
| HN1355 | The Medicant | Leslie Harradine | 1929 | 1938 |
| HN1356 | The Parson's Daughter | | | |
| HN1357 | Kathleen | Leslie Harradine | | |
| HN1358 | Rosina | Leslie Harradine | 1929 | 1937 |
| HN1359 | Two-A-Penny | | | |
| HN1360 | Sweet and Twenty | | | |
| HN1361 | Mask Seller | | | |
| HN1362 | Pantalettes | Leslie Harradine | 1929 | 1942 |
| HN1363 | Doreen | | | |
| HN1334 | Rosina | | | |
| HN1365 | The Mendicant | Leslie Harradine | 1929 | 1969 |
| HN1366 | The Moor | | | |
| HN1367 | Kitty | | | |
| HN1368 | Rose | Leslie Harradine | 1930 | 1995 |
| HN1369 | Boy on Pig | | | |
| HN1370 | Marie | Leslie Harradine | 1930 | 1988 |
| HN1371 | Darling | | | |
| HN1372 | | | | |
| HN1373 | Sweet Lavender | | | |
| HN1374 | Fairy | Leslie Harradine | | |
| HN1375 | | | | |
| HN1376 | Fairy | Leslie Harradine | | |
| HN1377 | | | | |
| HN1378 | Fairy | Leslie Harradine | | |
| HN1379 | | | | |
| HN1380 | | | | |
| HN1381 | | | | |
| HN1382 | | | | |
| HN1383 | | | | |
| HN1384 | | | | |
| HN1385 | | | | |
| HN1386 | | | | |
| HN1387 | Rose | Leslie Harradine | 1930 | 1938 |
| HN1388 | Marie | Leslie Harradine | 1930 | 1938 |
| HN1389 | Doreen | | | |
| HN1390 | Doreen, lavender dress w/yellow flowers | | | |
| HN1391 | Pierrette | | | |
| HN1392 | Paisley Shawl | Leslie Harradine | 1930 | 1949 |
| HN1393 | | | | |
| HN1394 | | | | |
| HN1395 | Fairy | Leslie Harradine | | |
| HN1396 | | | | |
| HN1397 | Gretchen | | | |
| HN1398 | Derrick | Leslie Harradine | 1930 | 1940 |
| HN1399 | The Young Widow | | | |

== HN1400 to 1499 ==
| # | Title | Designer(s) | From | To |
|---|---|---|---|---|
| HN1400 | The Windmill Lady | Leslie Harradine | 1930 | 1937 |
| HN1401 | Chorus Girl | | | |
| HN1402 | Miss Demure | Leslie Harradine | 1930 | 1975 |
| HN1403 | | | | |
| HN1404 | Betty | | | |
| HN1405 | Betty | | | |
| HN1406 | The Flower Seller's Children | | | |
| HN1407 | The Winner | | | |
| HN1408 | John Peel | | 1930 | 1937 |
| HN1409 | Hunting Squire | | | |
| HN1410 | Abdullah | Leslie Harradine | 1930 | 1937 |
| HN1411 | Charley's Aunt | | | |
| HN1412 | Pantalettes | Leslie Harradine | 1930 | 1949 |
| HN1413 | Margery | Leslie Harradine | 1930 | 1949 |
| HN1414 | Patricia | Leslie Harradine | 1930 | 1949 |
| HN1415 | | | | |
| HN1416 | Rose | Leslie Harradine | 1930 | 1949 |
| HN1417 | Marie | Leslie Harradine | 1930 | 1949 |
| HN1418 | The Little Mother | | | |
| HN1419 | Dulcinea | Leslie Harradine | 1930 | 1938 |
| HN1420 | Phyllis | Leslie Harradine | 1930 | 1949 |
| HN1421 | Barbara | Leslie Harradine | | |
| HN1422 | Joan | Leslie Harradine | 1930 | 1949 |
| HN1423 | Babette | Leslie Harradine | 1930 | 1937 |
| HN1424 | Babette (blue) | Leslie Harradine | 1930 | 1938 |
| HN1425 | The Moor | | | |
| HN1426 | The Gossips | Leslie Harradine | 1930 | 1949 |
| HN1427 | Darby | Leslie Harradine | 1930 | 1949 |
| HN1428 | Calumet | | | |
| HN1429 | The Gossips | | | |
| HN1430 | Phyllis | | | |
| HN1431 | Patricia | | | |
| HN1432 | Barbra | | | |
| HN1433 | Little Bridesmaid | Leslie Harradine | 1930 | 1951 |
| HN1434 | Little Bridesmaid | Leslie Harradine | 1930 | 1949 |
| HN1435 | Betty | | | |
| HN1436 | Betty | | | |
| HN1437 | Sweet and Twenty | | | |
| HN1438 | Sweet and Twenty | | | |
| HN1439 | Columbine | | | |
| HN1440 | Miss Demure | | | |
| HN1441 | Child Study | | | |
| HN1442 | Child Study | | | |
| HN1443 | Child Study | | | |
| HN1444 | Pauline | Leslie Harradine | 1931 | 1940 |
| HN1445 | Biddy | Leslie Harradine | 1931 | 1937 |
| HN1446 | Marietta | Leslie Harradine | 1931 | 1940 |
| HN1447 | Marigold | Leslie Harradine | 1931 | 1949 |
| HN1448 | Rita | | | |
| HN1449 | The Little Mistress | | | |
| HN1450 | Rita | | | |
| HN1451 | Marigold | | | |
| HN1452 | A Victorian Lady | | | |
| HN1453 | The Orange Lady | | | |
| HN1454 | Negligee | | | |
| HN1455 | Molly Malone | | | |
| HN1456 | The Butterfly Woman | Leslie Harradine | 1931 | 1940 |
| HN1457 | All-A-Blooming | | | |
| HN1458 | Monica | Leslie Harradine | 1931 | 1949 |
| HN1459 | Monica | Leslie Harradine | 1931 | 1949 |
| HN1460 | Paisley Shawl | | | |
| HN1461 | Barbara | Leslie Harradine | 1931 | 1937 |
| HN1462 | Patricia | | | |
| HN1463 | Miss Demure | | | |
| HN1464 | The Carpet Seller (Hand Open) | Leslie Harradine | | 1969 |
| HN1464A | The Carpet Seller (Hand Closed) | Leslie Harradine | | 1969 |
| HN1465 | Biddy | Leslie Harradine | 1920 | |
| HN1466 | All-A-Blooming | Leslie Harradine | 1931 | 1938 |
| HN1467 | Monica | Leslie Harradine | 1931 | 1955 |
| HN1468 | Pamela | | | |
| HN1469 | Pamela | | | |
| HN1470 | Chloe | Leslie Harradine | 1931 | 1949 |
| HN1471 | Annette | | | |
| HN1472 | Annette | | | |
| HN1473 | Dreamland | Leslie Harradine | 1931 | 1937 |
| HN1474 | In the Socks | | | |
| HN1475 | In the Socks | Leslie Harradine | 1931 | 1937 |
| HN1476 | Chloe | | | |
| HN1477 | | | | |
| HN1478 | Sylvia | | | |
| HN1479 | Chloe | Leslie Harradine | 1931 | 1938 |
| HN1480 | Newhaven Fishwife | Harry Fenton | 1931 | 1938 |
| HN1481 | Dreamland | | | |
| HN1482 | Pearly Boy | Leslie Harradine | 1931 | 1949 |
| HN1483 | Pearly Girl | Leslie Harradine | 1931 | 1949 |
| HN1484 | Jennifer | | | |
| HN1485 | Greta | Leslie Harradine | 1931 | 1953 |
| HN1486 | Phyllis | | | |
| HN1487 | Suzette | Leslie Harradine | 1931 | 1950 |
| HN1488 | Gloria | Leslie Harradine | 1932 | 1938 |
| HN1489 | Marie | Leslie Harradine | 1932 | 1949 |
| HN1490 | Dorcas | | | |
| HN1491 | Dorcas | Leslie Harradine | 1932 | |
| HN1492 | Old Lavender Seller | | | |
| HN1493 | The Potter | | | |
| HN1494 | Gwendolen | Leslie Harradine | 1932 | |
| HN1495 | Priscilla | | | |
| HN1496 | Sweet Anne | Leslie Harradine | 1932 | 1967 |
| HN1497 | Rosamund | | | |
| HN1498 | Chloe | | | |
| HN1499 | Miss Demure | | | |

== HN1500 to 1599 ==
| # | Title | Designer(s) | From | To |
|---|---|---|---|---|
| HN1500 | Biddy | | | |
| HN1501 | Priscilla | | | |
| HN1502 | Lucy Ann | Leslie Harradine | 1932 | 1951 |
| HN1503 | Gwendolen | | | |
| HN1504 | Sweet Maid | | | |
| HN1505 | Sweet Maid | | | |
| HN1506 | Rose | | | |
| HN1507 | Pantalettes | | | |
| HN1508 | Helen | | | |
| HN1509 | Helen (pale blue / pink - 8") | Leslie Harradine | 1932 | 1938 |
| HN1510 | Constance | | | |
| HN1511 | Constance | | | |
| HN1512 | Kathleen | | | |
| HN1513 | Biddy | | 1931 | 1941 |
| HN1514 | Dolly Vardon | Leslie Harradine | 1932 | 1938 |
| HN1515 | Dolly Vardon | Leslie Harradine | | |
| HN1516 | Cicely | | | |
| HN1517 | Veronica | | | |
| HN1518 | The Potter | Charles J. Noke | 1932 | 1949 |
| HN1519 | Veronica | | | |
| HN1520 | Eugene | Leslie Harradine | 1932 | |
| HN1521 | Eugene (pale blue dress, pink coat - 5") | Leslie Harradine | 1932 | 1936 |
| HN1522 | The Potter | | | |
| HN1523 | Lisette | | | |
| HN1524 | Lisette (blue, pink) | Leslie Harradine | 1932 | 1938 |
| HN1525 | Clarissa | Leslie Harradine | 1932 | 1938 |
| HN1526 | Athena | | | |
| HN1527 | Athena | | | |
| HN1528 | Bluebeard | Leslie Harradine | 1932 | 1949 |
| HN1529 | A Victorian Lady | | | |
| HN1530 | The Little Bridesmaid | | | |
| HN1531 | Marie | | | |
| HN1532 | Fairy | | | |
| HN1533 | Fairy | | | |
| HN1534 | Fairy | | | |
| HN1535 | Fairy | | | |
| HN1536 | Fairy | | | |
| HN1537 | Janet | Leslie Harradine | 1932 | 1995 |
| HN1538 | Janet | | | |
| HN1539 | A Saucy Nymph | | | |
| HN1540 | Here A Little Child I Stand | Leslie Harradine | 1933 | 1949 |
| HN1540W | Here A Little Child I Stand (white) | Leslie Harradine | | |
| HN1541 | Happy Joy, Baby Boy | Leslie Harradine | | |
| HN1541W | Happy Joy, Baby Boy (white) | Leslie Harradine | | |
| HN1542 | Little Child So Rare and Sweet | | | |
| HN1543 | Dancing Eyes and Sunny Hair | | | |
| HN1544 | Do You Wonder Where Fairies Are That Fold Declare Have Vanished | Leslie Harradine | | |
| HN1545 | Called Love, Baby Boy, Almost Naked Wanton, Blind, Cruel Now, and Then as Kind | | | |
| HN1546 | Little Child So Rare And Sweet | Leslie Harradine | 1933 | 1949 |
| HN1547 | Pearly Boy | | | |
| HN1548 | Pearly Girl | | | |
| HN1549 | Sweet and Twenty | Leslie Harradine | 1933 | 1949 |
| HN1550 | Annette | Leslie Harradine | 1933 | 1949 |
| HN1551 | Rosamund | | | |
| HN1552 | Pinkie | | | |
| HN1553 | Pinkie | | | |
| HN1554 | Charley's Aunt | | | |
| HN1555 | Marigold | | | |
| HN1556 | Rosina | | | |
| HN1557 | Lady Fayre | | | |
| HN1558 | Dorcas | Leslie Harradine | 1933 | 1952 |
| HN1559 | Priscilla | Leslie Harradine | 1933 | 1952 |
| HN1560 | Miss Demure | Leslie Harradine | 1933 | 1949 |
| HN1561 | Willy-Won't He | Leslie Harradine | 1933 | 1949 |
| HN1562 | Gretchen | Leslie Harradine | 1933 | 1940 |
| HN1563 | Sweet and Twenty | | | |
| HN1564 | Pamela | | | |
| HN1565 | Lucy Ann | | | |
| HN1566 | Estelle | | | |
| HN1567 | Patricia | | | |
| HN1568 | Charmain (pink coat - 6.5") | Leslie Harradine | 1933 | 1940 |
| HN1569 | Charmain (lavender coat - 6.5") | Leslie Harradine | 1933 | 1940 |
| HN1570 | Gwendolen | | | |
| HN1571 | Old Lavender Seller | | | |
| HN1572 | Helen | | | |
| HN1573 | Rhonda | | | |
| HN1574 | Rhonda | Leslie Harradine | 1933 | 1940 |
| HN1575 | Daisy | Leslie Harradine | 1933 | 1949 |
| HN1576 | Tildy | | | |
| HN1577 | Suzette | | | |
| HN1578 | The Hinged Parasol | | | |
| HN1579 | The Hinged Parasol | | | |
| HN1580 | Rosebud (pink dress) | Leslie Harradine | 1933 | 1938 |
| HN1581 | Rosebud (blue dress) | Leslie Harradine | 1933 | 1938 |
| HN1582 | Marion | | | |
| HN1583 | Willy-Won't He | | | |
| HN1584 | | | | |
| HN1585 | Suzette | | | |
| HN1586 | Camille | Leslie Harradine | 1933 | 1949 |
| HN1587 | Fleurette | Leslie Harradine | 1933 | |
| HN1588 | The Bride | | | |
| HN1589 | Sweet and Twenty | Leslie Harradine | 1934 | |
| HN1590 | | | | |
| HN1591 | | | | |
| HN1592 | | | | |
| HN1593 | | | | |
| HN1594 | | | | |
| HN1595 | | | | |
| HN1596 | | | | |
| HN1597 | | | | |
| HN1598 | Clothide | | | |
| HN1599 | Clothide | | | |

== HN1600 to 1699 ==
| # | Title | Designer(s) | From | To |
|---|---|---|---|---|
| HN1600 | The Bride | | 1933 | 1949 |
| HN1601 | | | | |
| HN1602 | | | | |
| HN1603 | | | | |
| HN1604 | The Emir | | | |
| HN1605 | The Emir | | | |
| HN1606 | Falstaff | | | |
| HN1607 | Cerise | Leslie Harradine | 1933 | 1949 |
| HN1608 | | | | |
| HN1609 | | | | |
| HN1610 | Sweet and Twenty | | | |
| HN1611 | | | | |
| HN1612 | | | | |
| HN1613 | | | | |
| HN1614 | | | | |
| HN1615 | | | | |
| HN1616 | | | | |
| HN1617 | Primroses | | 1934 | 1939 |
| HN1618 | Maisie | | | |
| HN1619 | Maisie | | | |
| HN1620 | Rosabell | | | |
| HN1621 | Irene | | | |
| HN1622 | Evelyn | Leslie Harradine | | |
| HN1623 | | | | |
| HN1624 | | | | |
| HN1625 | | | | |
| HN1626 | Bonnie Lassie | Leslie Harradine | 1934 | 1953 |
| HN1627 | Curly Knob | | | |
| HN1628 | Margot | Leslie Harradine | 1934 | 1938 |
| HN1629 | Grizel | | | |
| HN1630 | Jester Wall Mask | Harry Fenton | 1936 | 1940 |
| HN1631 | Sweet Anne | | | |
| HN1632 | A Gentlewoman | | 1934 | |
| HN1633 | Clemency | | | |
| HN1634 | Clemency | Leslie Harradine | 1934 | 1949 |
| HN1635 | Marie | | | |
| HN1636 | Margot | | | |
| HN1637 | Evelyn | | | |
| HN1638 | Ladybird | | | |
| HN1639 | Dainty May | Leslie Harradine | 1924 | 1949 |
| HN1642 | Granny's Shawl | Leslie Harradine | 1934 | 1949 |
| HN1643 | Clemency | Leslie Harradine | 1934 | 1938 |
| HN1644 | Herminia | Leslie Harradine | 1934 | 1938 |
| HN1647 | Granny's Shawl | Leslie Harradine | 1940s | |
| HN1653 | Margot | Leslie Harradine | 1934 | 1940 |
| HN1657 | The Moor | Charles J Noke | 1934 | 1949 |
| HN1662 | Delicia | Leslie Harradine | 1934 | 1938 |
| HN1666 | Miss Winsome | Leslie Harradine | 1934 | 1938 |
| HN1668 | Sibell | Leslie Harradine | 1934 | 1949 |
| HN1670 | Gillian | Leslie Harradine | 1935 | 1949 |
| HN1677 | Tinkle Bell | Leslie Harradine | 1935 | 1988 |
| HN1678 | Dinky Do | Leslie Harradine | 1934 | 1996 |
| HN1679 | Babie | Leslie Harradine | 1935 | 1992 |
| HN1680 | Tootles | Leslie Harradine | 1935 | 1975 |
| HN1681 | Delicia | Leslie Harradine | 1935 | 1938 |
| HN1685 | Cynthia | Leslie Harradine | 1935 | 1949 |
| HN1686 | Phyllis | | 1922 | 1927 |
| HN1689 | Calumet | Charles J Noke | 1935 | 1949 |
| HN1690 | June | Leslie Harradine | 1935 | 19 |
| HN1691 | June | Leslie Harradine | 1935 | 1949 |
| HN1695 | Sibell (green, orange) | Leslie Harradine | 1935 | 1949 |
| HN1697 | Irene (pink dress, green hat + bow, yellow bouquet) | Leslie Harradine | 1935 | 1949 |

== HN1700 to 1799 ==
| # | Title | Designer(s) | From | To |
|---|---|---|---|---|
| HN1702 | A Jester | Charles J Noke | 1935 | 1949 |
| HN1706 | Cobbler | Charles J Noke | 1935 | 1969 |
| HN1709 | Pantalettes | Leslie Harradine | | |
| HN1712 | Daffy Down Dilly | Leslie Harradine | 1935 | 1975 |
| HN1712 | The New Bonnet | Leslie Harradine | 1935 | 1949 |
| HN1715 | Millicent | Leslie Harradine | 1935 | 1949 |
| HN1716 | Dianna | Leslie Harradine | | |
| HN1719 | Kate Hardcastle | Leslie Harradine | 1935 | 1949 |
| HN1724 | Ruby, pink | Leslie Harradine | | |
| HN1725 | Ruby | Leslie Harradine | 1935 | 1949 |
| HN1728 | The New Bonnet | Leslie Harradine | 1935 | 1949 |
| HN1730 | Vera | | | |
| HN1731 | Daydreams | Leslie Harradine | 1935 | 1996 |
| HN1737 | Janet | Leslie Harradine | 1935 | 1949 |
| HN1744 | Mirabel | Leslie Harradine | 1935 | 1949 |
| HN1745 | The Rustic Swain | Leslie Harradine | 1935 | 1949 |
| HN1747 | Afternoon Tea | | | |
| HN1748 | Afternoon Tea | Mrs. Pleydell Railston | 1935 | |
| HN1751 | Sir Walter Raleigh | Leslie Harradine | 1936 | 1949 |
| HN1755 | Court Shoemaker | Leslie Harradine | 1923 | 1944 |
| HN1758 | Romany Sue | Leslie Harradine | 1936 | 1949 |
| HN1759 | Orange Lady | Leslie Harradine | 1936 | 1975 |
| HN1760 | 4 O'Clock | Leslie Harradine | 1936 | 1949 |
| HN1763 | Windflower | Leslie Harradine | 1936 | 1949 |
| HN1765 | Cloe | | | |
| HN1768 | Ivy | Leslie Harradine | 1936 | 1979 |
| HN1770 | Maureen | Leslie Harradine | 1936 | 1959 |
| HN1772 | Delight | Leslie Harradine | 1936 | 1967 |
| HN1793 | This Little Pig (red) | Leslie Harradine | 1936 | 1995 |
| HN1794 | This Little Pig (blue) | Leslie Harradine | 1936 | 1949 |
| HN1795 | M'lady's Maid | Leslie Harradine | 1936 | 1949 |
| HN1797 | Hazel | Leslie Harradine | 1936 | 19 |
| HN1798 | Lily | Leslie Harradine | 1936 | 1971 |

== HN1800 to 1899 ==
| # | Title | Designer(s) | From | To |
|---|---|---|---|---|
| HN1805 | To Bed | | | |
| HN1807 | Spring Flowers | Leslie Harradine | 1937 | 1993 |
| HN1808 | Cissie (green dress, purple hat) | | | |
| HN1809 | Cissie | Leslie Harradine | 1937 | 1993 |
| HN1811 | Bo-Peep | Leslie Harradine | 1937 | 1995 |
| HN1812 | Forget Me Not | Leslie Harradine | 1937 | 1949 |
| HN1813 | Forget-Me-Not | Leslie Harradine | 1937 | 1949 |
| HN1815 | The Huntsman (mounted) | | 1937 | 1949 |
| HN1821 | Reflections | | | |
| HN1833 | Top ‘O The Hill | Leslie Harradine | 1937 | 1971 |
| HN1834 | Top ‘O The Hill | Leslie Harradine | 1938 | 2004 |
| HN1835 | Vernena | Leslie Harradine | 1938 | 1949 |
| HN1836 | Vanessa | Leslie Harradine | 1938 | 1949 |
| HN1840 | Christine | Leslie Harradine | 1938 | 1949 |
| HN1843 | Biddy Penny Farthing | Leslie Harradine | 1938 | Present |
| HN1845 | Modena (blue, pink dress, flowered scarf) | Leslie Harradine | 1938 | 1949 |
| HN1846 | Modena | Leslie Harradine | 1938 | 1949 |
| HN1847 | Reflections | Leslie Harradine | 1938 | 1949 |
| HN1849 | Top ‘O The Hill | Leslie Harradine | 1938 | 1975 |
| HN1850 | Antoinette | | | |
| HN1855 | Memories | Leslie Harradine | 1938 | 1949 |
| HN1857 | Memories | Leslie Harradine | 1938 | 1949 |
| HN1858 | Dawn | Leslie Harradine | | 1949 |
| HN1861 | Kate Hardcastle | Leslie Harradine | 1938 | 1949 |
| HN1862 | Jasmine | Leslie Harradine | 1938 | 1949 |
| HN1864 | Sweet & Fair | Leslie Harradine | 1938 | 1949 |
| HN1867 | Wedding Morn | Leslie Harradine | 1938 | 1949 |
| HN1870 | Little Lady Make Believe | Leslie Harradine | 1938 | 1949 |
| HN1872 | Annabella | Leslie Harradine | 1938 | 1949 |
| HN1879 | Bon Jour | Leslie Harradine | 1938 | 1949 |
| HN1881 | The Lambeth Walk | Leslie Harradine | 1938 | 1949 |
| HN1882 | Nell Gwynn | Leslie Harradine | 1938 | 1949 |
| HN1884 | Prudence | Leslie Harradine | 1938 | 1949 |
| HN1887 | Nell Gwynn (pink, blue, 6.5" tall) | Leslie Harradine | 1938 | 1949 |
| HN1888 | Bonjour | Leslie Harradine | 1938 | 19 |
| HN1890 | Lambing Time | W.M. Chance | 1938 | 1981 |
| HN1893 | Fat Boy | Leslie Harradine | 1938 | 1952 |
| HN1894 | Mr Pickwick | | 1938 | 1952 |
| HN1895 | Mr Micawber | | 1938 | 1952 |
| HN1897 | Miss Fortune | Leslie Harradine | 1938 | 1949 |

== HN1900 to 1999 ==
| # | Title | Designer(s) | From | To |
|---|---|---|---|---|
| HN1900 | Midsummer Noon | Leslie Harradine | 1939 | 1949 |
| HN1901 | Penelope | Leslie Harradine | 1939 | 1975 |
| HN1902 | Penelope | Leslie Harradine | 1939 | 1949 |
| HN1903 | Rhythm | Leslie Harradine | 1939 | 1949 |
| HN1904 | Rhythm | Leslie Harradine | 1939 | 1949 |
| HN1905 | Goody Two Shoes | Leslie Harradine | 1939 | 1949 |
| HN1906 | Lydia (Orange and pink) | Leslie Harradine | 1939 | 1949 |
| HN1907 | Lydia (Green) | Leslie Harradine | 1939 | 1949 |
| HN1908 | Lydia (Red) | Leslie Harradine | 1939 | 1995 |
| HN1909 | Honey (Blue) | Leslie Harradine | 1939 | 1949 |
| HN1910 | Honey (Pink) | Leslie Harradine | 1939 | 1949 |
| HN1911 | Autumn Breezes | Leslie Harradine | 1939 | 1976 |
| HN1912 | Old Balloon Seller and Bulldog | Leslie Harradine | 1939 | 1949 |
| HN1913 | Autumn Breezes | Leslie Harradine | 1939 | 1971 |
| HN1914 | Paisley Shawl | Leslie Harradine | 1939 | 1949 |
| HN1915 | Veronica | Leslie Harradine | 1939 | 1949 |
| HN1916 | Janet | Leslie Harradine | 1939 | 1949 |
| HN1917 | Meryll | Leslie Harradine | 1939 | 1940 |
| HN1918 | Sweet Suzy | Leslie Harradine | 1939 | 1949 |
| HN1919 | Kate Hardcastle | Leslie Harradine | 1939 | 1949 |
| HN1920 | Windflower | Leslie Harradine | 1939 | 1949 |
| HN1921 | Roseanna | Leslie Harradine | 1940 | 1949 |
| HN1922 | Spring Morning | Leslie Harradine | 1940 | 1973 |
| HN1923 | Spring Morning | Leslie Harradine | 1940 | 1949 |
| HN1924 | Fiona | Leslie Harradine | 1940 | 1949 |
| HN1925 | Fiona | Leslie Harradine | 1940 | 1949 |
| HN1926 | Roseanna | Leslie Harradine | 1940 | 1959 |
| HN1927 | Awakening | Leslie Harradine | 1940 | 1949 |
| HN1928 | Marguerite | Leslie Harradine | 1940 | 1959 |
| HN1929 | Marguerite | Leslie Harradine | 1940 | 1949 |
| HN1930 | Marguerite | Leslie Harradine | 1940 | 1949 |
| HN1931 | Meriel | Leslie Harradine | 1940 | 1949 |
| HN1932 | Meriel | Leslie Harradine | 1940 | 1949 |
| HN1933 | Fiona | Leslie Harradine | 1940 | 1949 |
| HN1934 | Autumn Breezes | Leslie Harradine | 1939 | 1997 |
| HN1935 | Sweeting | Leslie Harradine | 1940 | 1973 |
| HN1936 | Miss Muffet | Leslie Harradine | 1940 | 1967 |
| HN1937 | Miss Muffet | Leslie Harradine | 1940 | 1952 |
| HN1938 | Sweeting | Leslie Harradine | 1940 | 1949 |
| HN1939 | Windflower | Leslie Harradine | 1940 | 1949 |
| HN1940 | Toinette | Leslie Harradine | 1940 | 1949 |
| HN1941 | Peggy | Leslie Harradine | 1940 | 1949 |
| HN1942 | Pyjams | Leslie Harradine | 1940 | 1949 |
| HN1943 | Veronica | Leslie Harradine | 1940 | 1949 |
| HN1944 | Daydream | Leslie Harradine | 1940 | 1949 |
| HN1945 | Spring Flowers | Leslie Harradine | 1940 | 1949 |
| HN1946 | Marguerite | Leslie Harradine | 1940 | 1949 |
| HN1947 | June | Leslie Harradine | 1940 | 1949 |
| HN1948 | Lady Charmian (Green dress with red shawl) | Leslie Harradine | 1940 | 1973 |
| HN1949 | Lady Charmian (Red dress with green shawl) | Leslie Harradine | 1940 | 1975 |
| HN1950 | Claribel | Leslie Harradine | 1940 | 1949 |
| HN1951 | Claribel | Leslie Harradine | 1940 | 1949 |
| HN1952 | Irene | Leslie Harradine | 1940 | 1950 |
| HN1953 | Orange Lady | Leslie Harradine | 1940 | 1975 |
| HN1954 | Balloon Man | Leslie Harradine | 1940 | Present |
| HN1955 | Lavinia | Leslie Harradine | 1940 | 1979 |
| HN1956 | Chloe | Leslie Harradine | 1940 | 1949 |
| HN1957 | New Bonnet | Leslie Harradine | 1940 | 1949 |
| HN1958 | Lady April | Leslie Harradine | 1940 | 1959 |
| HN1959 | Choice | Leslie Harradine | 1941 | 1949 |
| HN1960 | Choice | Leslie Harradine | 1941 | 1949 |
| HN1961 | Daisy | Leslie Harradine | 1941 | 1949 |
| HN1962 | Genevieve | Leslie Harradine | 1941 | 1975 |
| HN1963 | Honey | Leslie Harradine | 1941 | 1949 |
| HN1964 | Janet | Leslie Harradine | 1941 | 1949 |
| HN1965 | Lady April | Leslie Harradine | 1941 | 1949 |
| HN1966 | The Orange Vendor | C.J. Noke | 1941 | 1949 |
| HN1967 | Lady Betty | Leslie Harradine | 1941 | 1951 |
| HN1968 | Madonna of the Square | P Stabler | 1941 | 1949 |
| HN1969 | Madonna of the Square | P Stabler | 1941 | 1949 |
| HN1970 | Milady | Leslie Harradine | 1941 | 1949 |
| HN1971 | Springtime | Leslie Harradine | 1941 | 2949 |
| HN1972 | Regency Beau | Harry Fenton | 1941 | 1949 |
| HN1973 | Corinthian | Harry Fenton | 1941 | 1949 |
| HN1974 | Forty Winks | Harry Fenton | 1945 | 1973 |
| HN1975 | Shepherd | Harry Fenton | 1945 | 1975 |
| HN1976 | Easter Day | Leslie Harradine | 1945 | 1951 |
| HN1977 | Her Ladyship | Leslie Harradine | 1945 | 1959 |
| HN1978 | Bedtime | Leslie Harradine | 1945 | 1997 |
| HN1979 | Gollywog | Leslie Harradine | 1945 | 1959 |
| HN1980 | Gwynneth | Leslie Harradine | 1945 | 1952 |
| HN1981 | The Ermine Coat | Leslie Harradine | 1945 | 1967 |
| HN1982 | Sabbath Morn | Leslie Harradine | 1945 | 1959 |
| HN1983 | Rosebud | Leslie Harradine | 1945 | 1952 |
| HN1984 | Patchwork Quilt | Leslie Harradine | 1945 | 1959 |
| HN1985 | Darling | C Vyse | 1944 | 1997 |
| HN1986 | Diana | Leslie Harradine | 1946 | 1975 |
| HN1987 | Paisley Shawl | Leslie Harradine | 1946 | 1959 |
| HN1988 | Paisley Shawl | Leslie Harradine | 1946 | 1975 |
| HN1989 | Margaret | Leslie Harradine | 1947 | 1959 |
| HN1990 | Mary Jane | Leslie Harradine | 1947 | 1959 |
| HN1991 | Country Lass | Leslie Harradine | 1975 | 1981 |
| HN1992 | Christmas Morn | Peggy Davies | 1947 | 1996 |
| HN1993 | Griselda | Leslie Harradine | 1947 | 1953 |
| HN1994 | Karen | Leslie Harradine | 1947 | 1955 |
| HN1995 | Olivia | Leslie Harradine | 1947 | 1951 |
| HN1996 | Prue | Leslie Harradine | 1947 | 1955 |
| HN1997 | Belle o' the Ball | R Asplin | 1947 | 1979 |
| HN1998 | Collinette | Leslie Harradine | 1947 | 1949 |
| HN1999 | Collinette | Leslie Harradine | 1947 | 1949 |

== HN2000 to 2099 ==
| # | Title | Designer(s) | From | To |
|---|---|---|---|---|
| HN2000 | Jacqueline | Leslie Harradine | 1947 | 1951 |
| HN2001 | Jacqueline | Leslie Harradine | 1947 | 1951 |
| HN2002 | Bess | Leslie Harradine | 1947 | 1969 |
| HN2003 | Bess | Leslie Harradine | 1947 | 1950 |
| HN2004 | A Courting | Leslie Harradine | 1947 | 1953 |
| HN2005 | Henrietta Maria | Margaret Davies | 1948 | 1953 |
| HN2006 | The Lady Ann Nevill | Margaret Davies | 1948 | 1953 |
| HN2007 | Mrs Fitzherbert | Margaret Davies | 1948 | 1953 |
| HN2008 | Phillipa of Hainault | Margaret Davies | 1948 | 1953 |
| HN2009 | Eleanor of Provence | Margaret Davies | 1948 | 1953 |
| HN2010 | The Young Miss Nightingale | Margaret Davies | 1948 | 1953 |
| HN2011 | Matilda | Margaret Davies | 1948 | 1953 |
| HN2012 | Margaret of Anjou | Margaret Davies | 1948 | 1953 |
| HN2013 | Angelina | Leslie Harradine | 1948 | 1953 |
| HN2014 | June | Leslie Harradine | 1948 | 1953 |
| HN2015 | Sir Walter Raleigh | Leslie Harradine | 1948 | 1955 |
| HN2016 | The Jester | Charles J Noke | 1949 | 1997 |
| HN2017 | Silks And Ribbons | Leslie Harradine | 1949 | 2001 |
| HN2018 | The Parson's Daughter | H Tittensor | 1949 | 1953 |
| HN2019 | Minuet | Margaret Davies | 1949 | 1971 |
| HN2020 | Deidre | Leslie Harradine | 1949 | 1955 |
| HN2021 | Blithe Morning | Leslie Harradine | 1949 | 1971 |
| HN2022 | Janice | Margaret Davies | 1949 | 1955 |
| HN2023 | Joan | Leslie Harradine | 1949 | 1959 |
| HN2024 | Darby | Leslie Harradine | 1949 | 1959 |
| HN2025 | The Gossips | Leslie Harradine | 1949 | 1967 |
| HN2026 | Suzette | Leslie Harradine | 1949 | 1959 |
| HN2027 | June | Leslie Harradine | 1949 | 1952 |
| HN2028 | Kate Hardcastle | Leslie Harradine | 1949 | 1952 |
| HN2029 | Windflower | Leslie Harradine | 1949 | 1952 |
| HN2030 | Memories | Leslie Harradine | 1949 | 1959 |
| HN2031 | Granny's Heritage | Leslie Harradine | 1949 | 1969 |
| HN2032 | Jean | Leslie Harradine | 1949 | 1959 |
| HN2033 | Midsummer Morn | Leslie Harradine | 1949 | 1955 |
| HN2034 | Madonna of the Square | Pheobe Stabler | 1949 | 1951 |
| HN2035 | Pearly Boy | Leslie Harradine | 1949 | 1959 |
| HN2036 | Pearly Girl | Leslie Harradine | 1949 | 1959 |
| HN2037 | Goody Two Shoes | Leslie Harradine | 1949 | 1989 |
| HN2038 | Peggy | Leslie Harradine | 1949 | 1979 |
| HN2039 | Easter Day | Margaret Davies | 1949 | 1969 |
| HN2040 | Gollywog | Leslie Harradine | 1949 | 1955 |
| HN2041 | Broken Lance | Margaret Davies | 1949 | 1975 |
| HN2042 | Owd William | Leslie Harradine | 1949 | 1973 |
| HN2043 | The Poacher | Leslie Harradine | 1949 | 1959 |
| HN2044 | Mary Mary | Leslie Harradine | 1949 | 1973 |
| HN2045 | She Loves Me Not | Leslie Harradine | 1949 | 1962 |
| HN2046 | He Loves Me | Leslie Harradine | 1949 | 1962 |
| HN2047 | Once Upon A Time | Leslie Harradine | 1949 | 1955 |
| HN2048 | Mary Had A Little Lamb | Margaret Davies | 1949 | 1980's |
| HN2049 | Curley Locks | Margaret Davies | 1949 | 1983 |
| HN2050 | Wee Willie Winkle | Margaret Davies | 1949 | 1953 |
| HN2051 | St George | Margaret Davies | 1950 | 1985 |
| HN2052 | Grandma | Leslie Harradine | 1950 | 1959 |
| HN2052a | Grandma | Leslie Harradine | 1950 | 1959 |
| HN2053 | The Gaffer | Leslie Harradine | 1950 | 1959 |
| HN2054 | Falstaff | Charles J Noke | 1950 | 1992 |
| HN2055 | The Leisure Hour | Margaret Davies | 1950 | 1965 |
| HN2056 | Susan | Leslie Harradine | 1950 | 1959 |
| HN2057 | The Jersey Milkmaid | Leslie Harradine | 1950 | 1959 |
| HN2057a | Milkmaid | Leslie Harradine | 1975 | 1981 |
| HN2058 | Hermione | Margaret Davies | 1950 | 1952 |
| HN2059 | The Bedtime Story | Leslie Harradine | 1950 | 1996 |
| HN2060 | Jack | Leslie Harradine | 1950 | 1971 |
| HN2061 | Jill | Leslie Harradine | 1950 | 1971 |
| HN2062 | Little Boy Blue | Leslie Harradine | 1950 | 1973 |
| HN2063 | Little Jack Horner | Leslie Harradine | 1950 | 1953 |
| HN2064 | My Pretty Maid | Leslie Harradine | 1950 | 1954 |
| HN2065 | Blithe Morning | Leslie Harradine | 1950 | 1973 |
| HN2066 | Minuet | Margaret Davies | 1950 | 1955 |
| HN2067 | St George | Stanley Thorogood | 1950 | 1976 |
| HN2068 | Calumet | Charles J Noke | 1950 | 1953 |
| HN2069 | The Farmers Wife | Leslie Harradine | 1951 | 1955 |
| HN2070 | Bridget | Leslie Harradine | 1951 | 1973 |
| HN2071 | Bernice | Margaret Davies | 1951 | 1953 |
| HN2072 | The Rocking Horse | Leslie Harradine | 1951 | 1953 |
| HN2073 | Vivienne | Leslie Harradine | 1951 | 1967 |
| HN2074 | Marianne | Leslie Harradine | 1951 | 1953 |
| HN2075 | French Peasant | Leslie Harradine | 1951 | 1955 |
| HN2076 | Promenade | Margaret Davies | 1951 | 1953 |
| HN2077 | Rowena | Leslie Harradine | 1951 | 1955 |
| HN2078 | Elfreda | Leslie Harradine | 1951 | 1955 |
| HN2079 | Damaris | Margaret Davies | 1951 | 1952 |
| HN2080 | Jack Point | Charles J Noke | 1952 | Present |
| HN2081 | Princess Badoura | H Tittensor, F Van Allen Phillips and E Stanton | 1952 | Present |
| HN2082 | The Moor | Charles J Noke | 1952 | Present |
| HN2083 | | | | |
| HN2084 | King Charles | Charles J Noke and H Tittensor | 1952 | 1992 |
| HN2085 | Spring | Margaret Davies | 1952 | 1959 |
| HN2086 | Summer | Margaret Davies | 1952 | 1959 |
| HN2087 | Autumn | Margaret Davies | 1952 | 1959 |
| HN2088 | Winter | Margaret Davies | 1952 | 1959 |
| HN2089 | Judith | Leslie Harradine | 1952 | 1959 |
| HN2090 | Midinette | Leslie Harradine | 1952 | 1965 |
| HN2091 | Rosemary | Leslie Harradine | 1952 | 1959 |
| HN2092 | Sweet Maid | Leslie Harradine | 1952 | 1955 |
| HN2093 | Georgiana | Margaret Davies | 1952 | 1955 |
| HN2094 | Uncle Ned | H Fenton | 1952 | 1965 |
| HN2095 | Ibrahim | Charles J Noke | 1952 | 1955 |
| HN2096 | The Fat Boy | Leslie Harradine | 1952 | 1967 |
| HN2097 | Mr Micawber | Leslie Harradine | 1952 | 1967 |
| HN2098 | Pecksniff | Leslie Harradine | 1952 | 1967 |
| HN2099 | Mr Pickwick | Leslie Harradine | 1952 | 1967 |

== HN2100 to 2199 ==
| # | Title | Designer(s) | From | To |
|---|---|---|---|---|
| HN2100 | Sairey Gump | Leslie Harradine | 1952 | 1967 |
| HN2101 | Uriah Heep | Leslie Harradine | 1952 | 1967 |
| HN2102 | Pied Piper | Leslie Harradine | 1953 | 1976 |
| HN2103 | Mask Seller | Leslie Harradine | 1953 | 1995 |
| HN2104 | Abdullah | Leslie Harradine | 1953 | 1962 |
| HN2105 | Bluebeard | Leslie Harradine | 1953 | 1992 |
| HN2106 | Linda | Leslie Harradine | 1953 | 1976 |
| HN2107 | Valerie | Margaret Davies | 1953 | 1995 |
| HN2108 | Baby Bunting | Margaret Davies | 1953 | 1959 |
| HN2109 | Wendy | Leslie Harradine | 1953 | 1995 |
| HN2110 | Christmas Time | Margaret Davies | 1953 | 1967 |
| HN2111 | Betsy | Leslie Harradine | 1953 | 1959 |
| HN2112 | Carolyn | Leslie Harradine | 1953 | 1965 |
| HN2113 | Maytime | Leslie Harradine | 1953 | 1967 |
| HN2114 | Sleepyhead | Margaret Davies | 1953 | 1955 |
| HN2115 | Coppelia | Margaret Davies | 1953 | 1959 |
| HN2116 | Ballerina | Margaret Davies | 1953 | 1973 |
| HN2117 | Skater | Margaret Davies | 1953 | 1971 |
| HN2118 | Good King Wenceslas | Margaret Davies | 1953 | 1976 |
| HN2119 | Town Crier | Margaret Davies | 1953 | 1976 |
| HN2120 | Dinky Do | Leslie Harradine | 1983 | 1996 |
| HN2121 | Babie | Leslie Harradine | 1983 | 1992 |
| HN2122 | Yeomen of the Guard | Leslie Harradine | 1954 | 1959 |
| HN2123 | Rose | Leslie Harradine | 1983 | 1995 |
| HN2125 | This Little Pig | Leslie Harradine | 1984 | 1995 |
| HN2126 | Top ‘O The Hill | Leslie Harradine | 1988 | 1988 |
| HN2127 | Top ‘O The Hill | Leslie Harradine | 1988 | 1988 |
| HN2128 | River Boy | Margaret Davies | 1962 | 1975 |
| HN2129 | Old Balloon Seller | Leslie Harradine | 1989 | 1991 |
| HN2130 | Balloon Seller | Leslie Harradine | 1989 | 1991 |
| HN2131 | Autumn Breezes | Leslie Harradine | 1990 | 1994 |
| HN2132 | Suitor | Margaret Davies | 1962 | 1971 |
| HN2133 | Faraway | Margaret Davies | 1958 | 1962 |
| HN2134 | The Old King | Charles J Noke | 1954 | 1992 |
| HN2135 | Gay Morning | Margaret Davies | 1954 | 1967 |
| HN2136 | Delphine | Margaret Davies | 1954 | 1967 |
| HN2137 | Lilac Time | Margaret Davies | 1954 | 1969 |
| HN2138 | La Sylphide | Margaret Davies | 1954 | 1965 |
| HN2139 | Giselle | Margaret Davies | 1954 | 1969 |
| HN2140 | Giselle – The Forest Glade | Margaret Davies | 1954 | 1969 |
| HN2141 | Choir Boy | Margaret Davies | 1954 | 1975 |
| HN2142 | Rag Doll | Margaret Davies | 1954 | 1986 |
| HN2143 | Friar Tuck | Margaret Davies | 1954 | 1965 |
| HN2144 | Jovial Monk | Margaret Davies | 1954 | 1976 |
| HN2145 | Wardrobe Mistress | Margaret Davies | 1954 | 1967 |
| HN2146 | Tinsmith | M Nicoll | 1962 | 1967 |
| HN2147 | Autumn Breezes | Leslie Harradine | 1955 | 1971 |
| HN2148 | Bridesmaid | Margaret Davies | 1955 | 1959 |
| HN2149 | Love Letter | Margaret Davies | 1958 | 1976 |
| HN2150 | Willy-Won't He | Leslie Harradine | 1955 | 1959 |
| HN2151 | Mother's Help | Margaret Davies | 1962 | 1969 |
| HN2152 | Adrienne | Margaret Davies | 1964 | 1976 |
| HN2153 | One Got Away | Margaret Davies | 1955 | 1959 |
| HN2154 | A Child From Williamsburg | Margaret Davies | 1964 | 1983 |
| HN2155 | | | | |
| HN2156 | Polka | Margaret Davies | 1955 | 1969 |
| HN2157 | A Gypsy Dance | Margaret Davies | 1955 | 1957 |
| HN2158 | Alice | Margaret Davies | 1960 | 1981 |
| HN2159 | Fortune Teller | Leslie Harradine | 1955 | 1967 |
| HN2160 | Apple Maid | Leslie Harradine | 1957 | 1962 |
| HN2161 | Hornpipe | M Nicoll | 1955 | 1962 |
| HN2162 | Foaming Quart | Margaret Davies | 1955 | 1992 |
| HN2163 | In The Stocks | M Nicoll | 1955 | 1959 |
| HN2165 | Janice | Margaret Davies | 1955 | 1965 |
| HN2166 | Bride | Margaret Davies | 1956 | 1976 |
| HN2167 | Home Again | Margaret Davies | 1956 | 1995 |
| HN2168 | Esmeralda | Margaret Davies | 1956 | 1959 |
| HN2169 | Dimity | Leslie Harradine | 1956 | 1959 |
| HN2170 | Invitation | Margaret Davies | 1956 | 1975 |
| HN2171 | Fiddler (Earthenware) | M Nicoll | 1956 | 1962 |
| HN2172 | Jolly Sailer | M Nicoll | 1956 | 1965 |
| HN2173 | Organ Grinder | M Nicoll | 1956 | 1965 |
| HN2174 | Tailor | M Nicoll | 1956 | 1959 |
| HN2175 | Beggar (Earthenware) | Leslie Harradine | 1956 | 1962 |
| HN2176 | Autumn Breezes | Leslie Harradine | 1991 | 1995 |
| HN2177 | My Teddy | Margaret Davies | 1962 | 1967 |
| HN2178 | Enchantment | Margaret Davies | 1957 | 1982 |
| HN2179 | Noelle | Margaret Davies | 1957 | 1967 |
| HN2180 | Autumn Breezes | Leslie Harradine | 1991 | 1995 |
| HN2181 | Summer's Day | Margaret Davies | 1957 | 1962 |
| HN2183 | Boy from Williamsburg | Margaret Davies | 1969 | 1983 |
| HN2184 | Sunday Morning | Margaret Davies | 1963 | 1969 |
| HN2185 | Columbine | Margaret Davies | 1957 | 1969 |
| HN2186 | Harlequin | Margaret Davies | 1957 | 1969 |
| HN2191 | Sea Sprite | Margaret Davies | 1958 | 1962 |
| HN2192 | Wood Nymph | Margaret Davies | 1958 | 1962 |
| HN2193 | Fair Lady | Margaret//Peggy Davies | 1963 | 1996 |
| HN2196 | Bridesmaid | Margaret Davies | 1960 | 1976 |

== HN2200 to 2299 ==
| # | Title | Designer(s) | From | To |
|---|---|---|---|---|
| HN2200 | Winsome | Margaret Davies | 1960 | 1985 |
| HN2202 | Melody | Margaret Davies | 1957 | 1962 |
| HN2203 | Teenager | Margaret Davies | 1957 | 1962 |
| HN2204 | Long John Silver | M Nicoll | 1957 | 1965 |
| HN2205 | Master Sweep | M Nicoll | 1957 | 1962 |
| HN2206 | Sunday Best | Margaret Davies | 1979 | 1984 |
| HN2207 | Stayed at Home | Margaret Davies | 1958 | 1969 |
| HN2208 | Silversmith of Williamsburg | Margaret Davies | 1960 | 1983 |
| HN2209 | Hostess of Williamsburg | Margaret Davies | 1960 | 1983 |
| HN2210 | Debutante | Margaret Davies | 1963 | 1967 |
| HN2211 | Fair Maiden | Margaret Davies | 1967 | 1994 |
| HN2212 | Rendezvous | Margaret Davies | 1962 | 1971 |
| HN2213 | Contemplation | Margaret Davies | 1982 | 1986 |
| HN2214 | Bunny | Margaret Davies | 1960 | 1975 |
| HN2215 | Sweet April | Margaret Davies | 1965 | 1967 |
| HN2216 | Pirouette | Margaret Davies | 1959 | 1967 |
| HN2217 | Old King Cole | Margaret Davies | 1963 | 1967 |
| HN2218 | Cookie | Margaret Davies | 1958 | 1975 |
| HN2219 | Bedtime | Leslie Harradine | 1992 | 1992 |
| HN2220 | Winsome | Margaret Davies | 1960 | 1985 |
| HN2221 | Nanny | M Nicoll | 1958 | 1991 |
| HN2222 | Camillia | Margaret Davies | 1960 | 1971 |
| HN2223 | Schoolmarm | Margaret Davies | 1958 | 1981 |
| HN2224 | Make Believe | M Nicoll | 1984 | 1988 |
| HN2225 | Make Believe | M Nicoll | 1962 | 1988 |
| HN2226 | Cellist | M Nicoll | 1960 | 1967 |
| HN2227 | Gentlemen From Williamsburg | Margaret Davies | 1960 | 1983 |
| HN2228 | Lady From Williamsburg | Margaret Davies | 1960 | 1983 |
| HN2229 | Southern Belle | Margaret Davies | 1958 | 1997 |
| HN2230 | A Gypsy Dance | | 1959 | 1991 |
| HN2231 | Sweet Sixteen | Margaret Davies | 1958 | 1965 |
| HN2233 | Royal Governor's Cook | Margaret Davies | 1960 | 1983 |
| HN2234 | Michele | Margaret Davies | 1967 | 1993 |
| HN2235 | Dancing Years | Margaret Davies | 1965 | 1971 |
| HN2236 | Affection | Margaret Davies | 1962 | 1994 |
| HN2237 | Celeste | Margaret Davies | 1959 | 1971 |
| HN2238 | My Pet | Margaret Davies | 1962 | 1975 |
| HN2239 | Wigmaker Of Williamsburg | Margaret Davies | 1960 | 1983 |
| HN2240 | Blacksmith of Williamsburg | Margaret Davies | 1960 | 1983 |
| HN2241 | Contemplation | Margaret Davies | 1982 | 1986 |
| HN2242 | First Steps | Margaret Davies | 1959 | 1965 |
| HN2243 | Treasure Island | Margaret Davies | 1962 | 1975 |
| HN2244 | Newsboy | M Nicoll | 1959 | 1965 |
| HN2245 | Basket Weaver | M Nicoll | 1959 | 1962 |
| HN2246 | Cradle Song | Margaret Davies | 1959 | 1962 |
| HN2247 | Omar Khayyam | M Nicoll | 1965 | 1983 |
| HN2248 | Tall Story | M Nicoll | 1968 | 1975 |
| HN2249 | Favourite | M Nicoll | 1960 | 1990 |
| HN2250 | Toymaker | M Nicoll | 1959 | 1973 |
| HN2251 | Masquerade | Margaret Davies | 1960 | 1965 |
| HN2252 | Joker | M Nicoll | 1990 | 1992 |
| HN2253 | Puppetmaker | M Nicoll | 1962 | 1973 |
| HN2254 | Shore Leave | M Nicoll | 1965 | 1979 |
| HN2255 | Teatime | M Nicoll | 1972 | 1995 |
| HN2256 | Twilight | M Nicoll | 1971 | 1976 |
| HN2257 | Sea Harvest | M Nicoll | 1969 | 1976 |
| HN2258 | A Good Catch | M Nicoll | 1966 | 1986 |
| HN2259 | Masquerade | Margaret Davies | 1960 | 1965 |
| HN2260 | The Captain | M Nicoll | 1965 | 1982 |
| HN2261 | Marriage of Art and Industry | Margaret Davies | 1958 | 1958 |
| HN2262 | Lights Out | Margaret Davies | 1965 | 1969 |
| HN2263 | Seashore | Margaret Davies | 1961 | 1965 |
| HN2264 | Elegance | Margaret Davies | 1961 | 1985 |
| HN2265 | Sara | Margaret Davies | 1981 | 2000 |
| HN2266 | Ballad Seller | Margaret Davies | 1968 | 1973 |
| HN2267 | Rhapsody | Margaret Davies | 1961 | 1973 |
| HN2268 | Daphne | Margaret Davies | 1963 | 1975 |
| HN2269 | Leading Lady | Margaret Davies | 1965 | 1976 |
| HN2270 | Pillow Fight | Margaret Davies | 1965 | 1969 |
| HN2271 | Melanie | Margaret Davies | 1965 | 1981 |
| HN2272 | Repose | Margaret Davies | 1972 | 1979 |
| HN2273 | Denise | Margaret Davies | 1964 | 1971 |
| HN2274 | Golden Days | Margaret Davies | 1964 | 1973 |
| HN2275 | Sandra | Margaret Davies | 1969 | 1997 |
| HN2276 | Heart to Heart | Margaret Davies | 1961 | 1971 |
| HN2277 | Slapdash | M Nicoll | 1990 | 1994 |
| HN2278 | Judith | M Nicoll | 1986 | 1989 |
| HN2279 | Clockmaker | M Nicoll | 1961 | 1975 |
| HN2280 | Mayor | M Nicoll | 1963 | 1971 |
| HN2281 | Professor | M Nicoll | 1965 | 1981 |
| HN2282 | Coachman | M Nicoll | 1963 | 1971 |
| HN2283 | Dreamweaver | M Nicoll | 1972 | 1976 |
| HN2284 | Craftman | M Nicoll | 1961 | 1965 |
| HN2287 | Symphony | D B Lovegrove | 1961 | 1965 |

== HN2300 to 2399 ==
| # | Title | Designer(s) | From | To |
|---|---|---|---|---|
| HN2304 | Adrienne | Margaret Davies | 1964 | 1991 |
| HN2305 | Dulcie | Margaret Davies | 1981 | 1984 |
| HN2306 | Reverie | Margaret Davies | 1964 | 1981 |
| HN2307 | Coralie | Margaret Davies | 1964 | 1988 |
| HN2308 | Picnic | Margaret Davies | 1965 | 1988 |
| HN2309 | Buttercup | Margaret Davies | 1964 | 1997 |
| HN2310 | Lisa | Margaret Davies | 1968 | 1982 |
| HN2311 | Lorna | Margaret Davies | 1965 | 1985 |
| HN2312 | Soiree | Margaret Davies | 1967 | 1984 |
| HN2313 | Judith | M Nicoll | 1988 | 1988 |
| HN2314 | Old Mother Hubbard | M Nicoll | 1964 | 1975 |
| HN2315 | Last Waltz | M Nicoll | 1966 | 1993 |
| HN2316 | Last Waltz | M Nicoll | 1987 | 1987 |
| HN2317 | Lobster Man | M Nicoll | 1964 | 1994 |
| HN2318 | Grace | M Nicoll | 1966 | 1981 |
| HN2319 | Bachelor | M Nicoll | 1964 | 1975 |
| HN2320 | Tuppence A Bag | M Nicoll | 1968 | 1995 |
| HN2321 | Family Album | M Nicoll | 1966 | 1973 |
| HN2322 | Cup of Tea | M Nicoll | 1964 | 1983 |
| HN2323 | Lobster Man | M Nicoll | 1987 | 1995 |
| HN2324 | Matador and Bull | Margaret Davies | 1964 | Present |
| HN2325 | Master | Margaret Davies | 1967 | 1992 |
| HN2326 | Antoinette | Margaret Davies | 1967 | 1979 |
| HN2327 | Katrina | Margaret Davies | 1965 | 1969 |
| HN2328 | Queen of Sheba | Margaret Davies | 1982 | 1982 |
| HN2329 | Lynne | Margaret Davies | 1971 | 1996 |
| HN2330 | Meditation | Margaret Davies | 1971 | 1983 |
| HN2331 | Cello | Margaret Davies | 1970 | 1970 |
| HN2332 | Monte Carlo | Margaret Davies | 1982 | 1982 |
| HN2333 | Jacqueline | Margaret Davies | 1982 | 1991 |
| HN2334 | Fragrance | Margaret Davies | 1966 | 1995 |
| HN2335 | Hilary | Margaret Davies | 1966 | 1981 |
| HN2336 | Alison | Margaret Davies | 1966 | 1981 |
| HN2337 | Loretta | Margaret Davies | 1965 | 1981 |
| HN2338 | Penny | Margaret Davies | 1968 | 1995 |
| HN2339 | My Love | Margaret Davies | 1969 | 1996 |
| HN2340 | Belle | Margaret Davies | 1968 | 1988 |
| HN2341 | Cherie | Margaret Davies | 1965 | 1992 |
| HN2342 | Lucrezia Borgia | Margaret Davies | 1985 | 1985 |
| HN2343 | Premiere | Margaret Davies | 1969 | |
| HN2343a | Premiere | Margaret Davies | | 1979 |
| HN2344 | Deauville | Margaret Davies | 1982 | 1982 |
| HN2345 | Clarissa | Margaret Davies | 1968 | 1981 |
| HN2346 | Kathy | Margaret Davies | 1981 | 1987 |
| HN2347 | Nina | Margaret Davies | 1969 | 1976 |
| HN2348 | Geraldine | Margaret Davies | 1972 | 1976 |
| HN2349 | Flora | M Nicoll | 1966 | 1973 |
| HN2352 | A Stitch In Time | M Nicoll | 1966 | 1981 |
| HN2356 | Ascot | M Nicoll | 1968 | 1995 |
| HN2359 | Detective | M Nicoll | 1977 | 1983 |
| HN2361 | Laird | M Nicoll | 1969 | Present |
| HN2361a | Laird | M Nicoll | | 2001 |
| HN2362 | Wayfarer | M Nicoll | 1970 | 1976 |
| HN2368 | Fleur | John Bromley | 1968 | 1995 |
| HN2369 | Fleur | John Bromley | 1983 | 1986 |
| HN2370 | Sir Edward | John Bromley | 1979 | 1979 |
| HN2371 | Sir Ralph | John Bromley | 1979 | 1979 |
| HN2372 | Sir Thomas | John Bromley | 1979 | 1979 |
| HN2373 | Joanne | John Bromley | 1982 | 1988 |
| HN2374 | Mary | John Bromley | 1984 | 1986 |
| HN2375 | Viking | John Bromley | 1973 | 1976 |
| HN2376 | Indian Brave | Margaret Davies | 1967 | 1967 |
| HN2377 | Georgina | Margaret Davies | 1981 | 1986 |
| HN2378 | Simone | Margaret Davies | 1971 | 1981 |
| HN2379 | Ninette | Margaret Davies | 1971 | 1997 |
| HN2380 | Sweet Dreams | Margaret Davies | 1971 | 1990 |
| HN2381 | Kirsty | Margaret Davies | 1971 | 1996 |
| HN2382 | Secret Thoughts | Margaret Davies | 1971 | 1988 |
| HN2383 | Breton Dancer | Margaret Davies | 1981 | 1981 |
| HN2384 | West Indian Dancer | Margaret Davies | 1981 | 1981 |
| HN2385 | Debbie | Margaret Davies | 1969 | 1982 |
| HN2386 | HRH Prince Philip Duke of Edinburgh | Margaret Davies | 1981 | 1981 |
| HN2387 | Helen of Troy | Margaret Davies | 1981 | 1981 |
| HN2388 | Karen | Margaret Davies | 1982 | 1999 |
| HN2389 | Angela | Margaret Davies | 1983 | 1986 |
| HN2390 | Spinning | Margaret Davies | 1984 | 1984 |
| HN2391 | T'zu – His Empress Dowager | Margaret Davies | 1983 | 1983 |
| HN2392 | Jennifer | Margaret Davies | 1982 | 1992 |
| HN2393 | Rosalind | Margaret Davies | 1970 | 1975 |
| HN2394 | Lisa | Leslie Harradine | 1983 | 1990 |
| HN2395 | Catherine | Margaret Davies | 1983 | 1984 |
| HN2396 | Wistful | Margaret Davies | 1979 | 1990 |
| HN2397 | Margaret | Margaret Davies | 1982 | 1999 |
| HN2398 | Alexandra | Margaret Davies | 1970 | 1976 |
| HN2399 | Buttercup | Margaret Davies | 1983 | 1997 |

== HN2400 to 2499 ==
| # | Title | Designer(s) | From | To |
|---|---|---|---|---|
| HN2400 | Debbie | Margaret Davies | 1983 | 1995 |
| HN2401 | Sandra | Margaret Davies | 1983 | 1992 |
| HN2408 | A Penny's Worth | M Nicoll | 1986 | 1990 |
| HN2410 | Lesley | M Nicoll | 1986 | 1990 |
| HN2417 | Boatman (Skylark) | M Nicoll | 1971 | 1987 |
| HN2417a | Boatman (Pilot) | M Nicoll | 1971 | 1987 |
| HN2418 | Country Love | John Bromley | 1990 | 1990 |
| HN2419 | Goose Girl | John Bromley | 1990 | 1990 |
| HN2420 | Shepherdess | John Bromley | 1991 | 1991 |
| HN2421 | Charlotte | John Bromley | 1972 | 1986 |
| HN2422 | Francine | John Bromley | 1972 | |
| HN2422a | Francine | John Bromley | | 1981 |
| HN2423 | Charlotte | John Bromley | 1986 | 1992 |
| HN2424 | Penny | Margaret Davies | 1982 | 1992 |
| HN2425 | Southern Belle | Margaret Davies | 1983 | 1994 |
| HN2426 | Tranquility | Margaret Davies | 1981 | 1986 |
| HN2427 | Virginals | Margaret Davies | 1971 | 1971 |
| HN2428 | Palio | Margaret Davies | 1971 | 1971 |
| HN2429 | Elyse | Margaret Davies | 1972 | 1999 |
| HN2430 | Romance | Margaret Davies | 1972 | 1981 |
| HN2431 | Lute | Margaret Davies | 1972 | 1972 |
| HN2432 | Violin | Margaret Davies | 1972 | 1972 |
| HN2433 | Peace | Margaret Davies | 1981 | 1997 |
| HN2434 | Fair Maiden | Margaret Davies | 1983 | 1994 |
| HN2435 | Queen of the Ice | Margaret Davies | 1983 | 1986 |
| HN2436 | Scottish Highland Dancer | Margaret Davies | 1978 | 1978 |
| HN2437 | Queen of the Dawn | Margaret Davies | 1983 | 1986 |
| HN2438 | Sonata | Margaret Davies | 1983 | 1985 |
| HN2439 | Philippine Dancer | Margaret Davies | 1978 | 1978 |
| HN2440 | Cynthia | Margaret Davies | 1984 | 1992 |
| HN2441 | Pauline | Margaret Davies | 1983 | 1989 |
| HN2442 | Sailor's Holiday | M Nicoll | 1972 | 1979 |
| HN2443 | Judge | M Nicoll | 1972 | 1996 |
| HN2443a | Judge | M Nicoll | 1976 | 1992 |
| HN2444 | Bon Appetit (matte) | M Nicoll | 1972 | 1976 |
| HN2445 | Parisian | M Nicoll | 1972 | 1975 |
| HN2446 | Thanksgiving | M Nicoll | 1972 | 1976 |
| HN2455 | Seafarer | M Nicoll | 1972 | 1976 |
| HN2460 | Flower of Love | John Bromley | 1991 | 1997 |
| HN2461 | Janine | John Bromley | 1971 | 1995 |
| HN2463 | Olga | John Bromley | 1972 | 1975 |
| HN2465 | Elizabeth | John Bromley | 1990 | 1998 |
| HN2466 | Eve | Margaret Davies | 1984 | 1984 |
| HN2467 | Melissa | Margaret Davies | 1981 | 1994 |
| HN2468 | Diana | Margaret Davies | 1986 | 1999 |
| HN2469 | Tranquility | Margaret Davies | 1981 | 1986 |
| HN2470 | Peace | Margaret Davies | 1981 | 2000 |
| HN2471 | Victoria | Margaret Davies | 1973 | 2000 |
| HN2472 | Wistful | Margaret Davies | 1985 | 1985 |
| HN2473 | At Ease | Margaret Davies | 1973 | 1979 |
| HN2474 | Elyse | Margaret Davies | 1972 | 1999 |
| HN2475 | Vanity | Margaret Davies | 1973 | 1992 |
| HN2476 | Mandy | Margaret Davies | 1982 | 1992 |
| HN2477 | Denise | Margaret Davies | 1987 | 1996 |
| HN2478 | Kelly | Margaret Davies | 1985 | 1992 |
| HN2479 | Pamela | Margaret Davies | 1986 | 1994 |
| HN2480 | Adele | Margaret Davies | 1987 | 1992 |
| HN2481 | Maureen | Margaret Davies | 1987 | 1992 |
| HN2482 | Harp | Margaret Davies | 1973 | 1973 |
| HN2483 | Flute | Margaret Davies | 1973 | 1973 |
| HN2484 | Past Glory | M Nicoll | 1973 | 1979 |
| HN2485 | Lunchtime | M Nicoll | 1973 | 1983 |
| HN2492 | Huntsman | M Nicoll | 1974 | 1979 |
| HN2494 | Old Meg | M Nicoll | 1974 | 1976 |
| HN2499 | The Helmsman | M Nicoll | 1974 | 1986 |

== HN2500 to 2599 ==
| # | Title | Designer(s) | From | To |
|---|---|---|---|---|
| HN2502 | Queen Elizabeth II | Margaret Davies | 1973 | 1973 |
| HN2508 | Sealyham Terrier sitting, head to left | | 1938 | 1959 |
| HN2509 | Standing Sealyham Terrier | Frederick Daws | 1938 | 1959 |
| HN2510 | Running Character Terrier | | 1938 | 1959 |
| HN2511 | Standing Bull Terrier (type 2) | | 1938 | 1959 |
| HN2513 | Smooth Fox Terrier (6" H) | | 1938 | 1959 |
| HN2516 | Springer Spaniel "CH Dry Toast" | Frederick Thomas Daws | 1938 | 1968 |
| HN2517 | Springer Spaniel "CH Dry Toast" (sm) | Frederick Thomas Daws | | |
| HN2520 | Farmer's Boy | W M Chance | 1938 | 1960 |
| HN2521 | Dapple Grey | W M Chance | 1938 | 1960 |
| HN2524 | American Foxhound (Large) | Frederick Daws | 1938 | 1955 |
| HN2525 | American Foxhound (Med) | Frederick Daws | 1938 | 1960 |
| HN2529 | English Setter w/Pheasant on base (8.5") | Frederick Daws | 1939 | 1985 |
| HN2532 | Gude Grey Mare and foal (5.5" tall) | W. M. Chance | 1940 | 1967 |
| HN2537 | Merely a Minor (bay) (9.25" tall) | Frederick Daws | 1940 | 1960 |
| HN2538 | Merely a Minor (dapple grey) (9" tall) | | 1940s | 1950s |
| HN2542 | Boudoir | Eric J Griffiths | 1938 | 1960 |
| HN2543 | Eliza (Handmade Flowers) | Eric J Griffiths | 1974 | 1979 |
| HN2343a | Eliza (Painted Flowers) | Eric J Griffiths | 1974 | 1979 |
| HN2544 | A La Mode | Eric J Griffiths | 1974 | 1979 |
| HN2545 | Carmen | Eric J Griffiths | 1974 | 1979 |
| HN2546 | Buddies | Eric J Griffiths | 1973 | 1976 |
| HN2547 | RCMP 1973 | D V Tootle | 1973 | 1973 |
| HN2554 | Masque | D V Tootle | 1973 | 1975 |
| HN2554a | Masque | D V Tootle | 1975 | 1982 |
| HN2556 | RCMP 1873 | D V Tootle | 1973 | 1973 |
| HN2557 | Pembroke Welsh Corgi "CH Spring Robin" (8" tall) | Frederick Daws | | |
| HN2558 | Pembroke Welsh Corgi "CH Spring Robin" (5") | Frederick Daws | 1941 | 1968 |
| HN2559 | Pembroke Welsh Corgi "CH Spring Robin" (3.5" tall) | Frederick Daws | 1941 | 1985 |
| HN2564 | Pride of the Shires (bay) (6.5" H, 10"W) | W. M. Chance | 1941 | 1960 |
| HN2567 | Merely a Minor (dapple grey) (sm 6.5" tall) | Frederick Daws | 1941 | 1967 |
| HN2569 | Gude Grey Mare | | | |
| HN2578 | Punch (work horse) on base | W. M. Chance | | |
| HN2580 | Kitten licking paw | | | |
| HN2582 | Kitten, playful | | | |
| HN2585 | Spaniel Pup in basket (2 1/4" tall) | | | |
| HN2586 | Spaniel Pup in basket | | | |
| HN2587 | Terrier Pup in basket | | | |
| HN2588 | Three Terrier Pups in basket | | 1941 | 1985 |
| HN2589 | Cairn Terrier begging | | 1941 | 1985 |
| HN2590 | Two Spaniels curled up (2" tall) | | | |
| HN2593 | Rabbit Hare, Lying Stretched (Lrg) | | | |
| HN2594 | Rabbit Hare Lying (legs stretched behind) Small | | 1996 | |

== HN2600 to 2699 ==
| # | Title | Designer(s) | From | To |
|---|---|---|---|---|
| HN2601 | Great Dane (9" H) | | | |
| HN2613 | Golden Crested Wren | | 1940's | |
| HN2623 | Chestnut Shire (on base) | W. M. Chance | 1941 | 1960 |
| HN2624 | Pointer on base | Margaret Davies | 1952 | 1985 |
| HN2631 | White French Poodle | Margaret Davies | 1952 | 1985 |
| HN2632 | Pheasant | | | |
| HN2633 | Peruvian Penguin | Charles Noke | 1952 | 1973 |
| HN2635 | Standing Drake (13.5") | | 1952 | 1974 |
| HN2638 | Leopard on Rock (Prestige Figurine) | Charles Noke | 1952 | 1981 |
| HN2639 | Tiger on Rock (Prestige Figurine) | Charles Noke | 1970 | 1979 |
| HN2640 | Fighter Elephant | Charles Noke | 1952 | 1992 |
| HN2641 | Lion on a Rock (Prestige) | Charles Noke | 1940 | 1959 |
| HN2643 | Boxer "CH Warlord of Mazelaine" (6.5" tall) | | | 1985 |
| HN2645 | Doberman Pinscher "CH Rancho Dobe's Storm" | Margaret Davies | 1955 | 1985 |
| HN2646 | Flambe Stalking Tiger - Style 2 (13.5" long) | Charles Noke | 1950 | 1996 |
| HN2648 | Pig on green turf head up (style one) | Margaret Davies | | |
| HN2650 | Pig laying on green turf | | | |
| HN2651 | Routing Pig on green turf | | | |
| HN2652 | Sitting Pig on green turf | | | |
| HN2653 | Pig on green turf head down (style six) | Margaret Davies | | |
| HN2654 | Jack Russell Terrier pup chewing slipper | | | |
| HN2656 | Pine Marten | Joseph Ledger | 1960 | 1969 |
| HN2657 | Langur Monkey | Jo Ledger | 1960 | 1969 |
| HN2667 | Black Labrador | John Bromley | 1967 | 1985 |
| HN2670 | Snowy Owl Figural Group | | | |
| HN2671 | Good Morning | M Nicoll | 1974 | 1976 |
| HN2677 | Taking Things Easy | M Nicoll | 1975 | 1987 |
| HN2678 | Carpenter | M Nicoll | 1986 | 1992 |
| HN2679 | Drummer Boy | M Nicoll | 1976 | 1981 |
| HN2680 | Taking Things Easy | M Nicoll | 1987 | 1996 |
| HN2683 | Stop Press | M Nicoll | 1977 | 1981 |
| HN2693 | October | Margaret Davies | 1987 | 1987 |
| HN2694 | Fiona | Margaret Davies | 1974 | 1981 |
| HN2695 | November | Margaret Davies | 1987 | 1987 |
| HN2696 | December | Margaret Davies | 1987 | 1987 |
| HN2697 | January | Margaret Davies | 1987 | 1987 |
| HN2698 | Sunday Best | Margaret Davies | 1985 | 1995 |
| HN2699 | Cymbals | Margaret Davies | 1974 | 1974 |

== HN2700 to 2799 ==
| # | Title | Designer(s) | From | To |
|---|---|---|---|---|
| HN2700 | Chitarrone | Margaret Davies | 1974 | 1974 |
| HN2701 | Deborah | Margaret Davies | 1983 | 1984 |
| HN2702 | Shirley | Margaret Davies | 1985 | 1997 |
| HN2703 | February | Margaret Davies | 1987 | 1987 |
| HN2704 | Pensive Moments | Margaret Davies | 1975 | 1981 |
| HN2705 | Julia | Margaret Davies | 1975 | 1990 |
| HN2706 | Julia | Margaret Davies | 1975 | 1990 |
| HN2707 | March | Margaret Davies | 1987 | 1987 |
| HN2708 | April | Margaret Davies | 1987 | 1987 |
| HN2709 | Regal Lady | Margaret Davies | 1975 | 1983 |
| HN2710 | Jean | Margaret Davies | 1983 | 1986 |
| HN2711 | May | Margaret Davies | 1987 | 1987 |
| HN2712 | Mantilla | Eric J Griffiths | 1974 | 1979 |
| HN2713 | Tenderness | Eric J Griffiths | 1982 | 1997 |
| HN2714 | Tenderness | Eric J Griffiths | 1982 | 1992 |
| HN2715 | Patricia | Margaret Davies | 1982 | 1985 |
| HN2716 | Cavalier | Eric J Griffiths | 1976 | 1982 |
| HN2717 | Private 2nd South Carolina Regiment, 1781 | Eric J Griffiths | 1975 | 1975 |
| HN2718 | Lady Pamela | D V Tootle | 1974 | 1981 |
| HN2719 | Laurianne | D V Tootle | 1974 | 1979 |
| HN2720 | Family | Eric J Griffiths | 1981 | 2002 |
| HN2721 | Family | Eric J Griffiths | 1981 | 1992 |
| HN2722 | Veneta | William K Harper | 1974 | 1981 |
| HN2723 | Grand Manner | William K Harper | 1975 | 1981 |
| HN2724 | Clarinda | William K Harper | 1975 | 1981 |
| HN2725 | Santa Claus | William K Harper | 1982 | 1993 |
| HN2726 | Centurian | William K Harper | 1982 | 1984 |
| HN2727 | Little Miss Muffet | William K Harper | 1984 | 1987 |
| HN2728 | Rest Awhile | William K Harper | 1981 | 1984 |
| HN2729 | Song of the Sea | William K Harper | 1982 | 1991 |
| HN2731 | Thanks Doc | William K Harper | 1975 | 1990 |
| HN2732 | Thank You | William K Harper | 1982 | 1986 |
| HN2733 | Office Of The Line | William K Harper | 1982 | 1986 |
| HN2734 | Sweet Seventeen | D V Tootle | 1975 | 1993 |
| HN2735 | Young Love | D V Tootle | 1975 | 1990 |
| HN2736 | Tracy | D V Tootle | 1983 | 1994 |
| HN2737 | Harlequin | D V Tootle | 1982 | Present |
| HN2738 | Columbine | D V Tootle | 1982 | Present |
| HN2739 | Ann | D V Tootle | 1983 | 1985 |
| HN2740 | Becky | D V Tootle | 1987 | 1992 |
| HN2741 | Sally | D V Tootle | 1987 | 1991 |
| HN2742 | Sheila | D V Tootle | 1983 | 1991 |
| HN2743 | Meg | D V Tootle | 1987 | 1991 |
| HN2744 | Modesty | D V Tootle | 1987 | 1991 |
| HN2745 | Florence | D V Tootle | 1987 | 1992 |
| HN2746 | May | D V Tootle | 1987 | 1992 |
| HN2747 | First Love | D V Tootle | 1987 | 1997 |
| HN2748 | Wedding Day | D V Tootle | 1987 | 2003 |
| HN2749 | Lizzie | D V Tootle | 1988 | 1991 |
| HN2750 | Wedding Vows | D V Tootle | 1988 | 1992 |
| HN4751 | Encore | D V Tootle | 1988 | 1989 |
| HN2752 | Major. 3rd New Jersey Regiment, 1776 | Eric J Griffiths | 1975 | 1975 |
| HN2753 | Serenade | Eric J Griffiths | 1983 | 1985 |
| HN2754 | Private 3rd North Carolina Regiment, 1778 | Eric J Griffiths | 1976 | 1976 |
| HN2755 | Captain. 2nd New York Regiment, 1775 | Eric J Griffiths | 1976 | 1976 |
| HN2756 | Musicale | Eric J Griffiths | 1983 | 1985 |
| HN2757 | Lyric | Eric J Griffiths | 1983 | 1985 |
| HN2758 | Linda | Eric J Griffiths | 1984 | 1988 |
| HN2759 | Private Rhode Island Regiment, 1781 | Eric J Griffiths | 1977 | 1977 |
| HN2760 | Private Massachusetts Regiment, 1778 | Eric J Griffiths | 1977 | 1977 |
| HN2761 | Private Delaware Regiment, 1776 | Eric J Griffiths | 1977 | 1977 |
| HN2762 | Lovers | D V Tootle | 1981 | 1997 |
| HN2763 | Lovers | D V Tootle | 1981 | 1992 |
| HN2764 | Lifeboat Man | William K Harper | 1987 | 1991 |
| HN2765 | Punch and Judy Man | William K Harper | 1981 | 1990 |
| HN2766 | Autumn Glory | William K Harper | 1988 | 1988 |
| HN2767 | Pearly Boy | William K Harper | 1988 | 1988 |
| HN2767a | Pearly Boy | William K Harper | 1989 | 1992 |
| HN2768 | Pretty Polly | William K Harper | 1984 | 1986 |
| HN2769 | Pearly Girl | William K Harper | 1988 | 1988 |
| HN2769a | Pearly Girl | William K Harper | 1989 | 1992 |
| HN2770 | New Companion | William K Harper | 1982 | 1985 |
| HN2771 | Charlie Chaplin | William K Harper | 1989 | 1989 |
| HN2772 | Ritz Bell Boy | William K Harper | 1989 | 1993 |
| HN2773 | Robin Hood | William K Harper | 1985 | 1990 |
| HN2774 | Stan Laurel | William K Harper | 1990 | 1990 |
| HN2775 | Oliver Hardy | William K Harper | 1990 | 1990 |
| HN2776 | Carpet Seller (Standing) | William K Harper | 1990 | 1995 |
| HN2777 | Groucho Marx | William K Harper | 1991 | 1991 |
| HN2778 | Bobby | William K Harper | 1992 | 1995 |
| HN2779 | Private 1st Georgia Regiment, 1777 | Eric J Griffiths | 1975 | 1975 |
| HN2780 | Corporal 1st New Hampshire Regiment, 1778 | Eric J Griffiths | 1975 | 1975 |
| HN2781 | Lifeguard | William K Harper | 1992 | 1995 |
| HN2782 | Blacksmith | William K Harper | 1987 | 1991 |
| HN2783 | Good Friends | William K Harper | 1985 | 1990 |
| HN2784 | Guardsman | William K Harper | 1992 | 1995 |
| HN2788 | Marjorie | Margaret Davies | 1980 | 1984 |
| HN2789 | Kate | Margaret Davies | 1978 | 1987 |
| HN2790 | June | Margaret Davies | 1987 | 1987 |
| HN2791 | Elaine | Margaret Davies | 1980 | 2000 |
| HN2792 | Christine | Margaret Davies | 1978 | 1994 |
| HN2793 | Clare | Margaret Davies | 1980 | 1984 |
| HN2794 | July | Margaret Davies | 1987 | 1987 |
| HN2795 | French Horn | Margaret Davies | 1976 | 1976 |
| HN2796 | Hurdy Gurdy | Margaret Davies | 1975 | 1975 |
| HN2797 | Viola d'Amore | Margaret Davies | 1976 | 1976 |
| HN2798 | Dulcimer | Margaret Davies | 1975 | 1975 |
| HN2799 | Ruth | Margaret Davies | 1976 | 1981 |

== HN2800 to 2899 ==
| # | Title | Designer(s) | From | To |
|---|---|---|---|---|
| HN2800 | Carrie | Margaret Davies | 1976 | 1981 |
| HN2801 | Lori | Margaret Davies | 1976 | 1987 |
| HN2802 | Anna | Margaret Davies | 1976 | 1982 |
| HN2803 | First Dance | Margaret Davies | 1977 | 1992 |
| HN2804 | Nicola | Margaret Davies | 1987 | 1987 |
| HN2805 | Rebecca | Margaret Davies | 1980 | 1996 |
| HN2806 | Jane | Margaret Davies | 1982 | 1986 |
| HN2807 | Stephanie | Margaret Davies | 1977 | 1982 |
| HN2808 | Balinese Dancer | Margaret Davies | 1982 | 1982 |
| HN2809 | North American Indian Dancer | Margaret Davies | 1982 | 1982 |
| HN2810 | Solitude | Margaret Davies | 1977 | 1983 |
| HN2811 | Stephanie | Margaret Davies | 1983 | 1994 |
| HN2812 | | | | |
| HN2813 | | | | |
| HN2814 | Eventide | William K Harper | 1977 | 1991 |
| HN2815 | Sergeant, 6th Maryland Regiment, 1777 | Eric J Griffiths | 1976 | 1976 |
| HN2816 | Votes For Women | William K Harper | 1978 | 1981 |
| HN2817 | | | | |
| HN2818 | Balloon Girl | William K Harper | 1982 | 1997 |
| HN2819 | | | | |
| HN2820 | | | | |
| HN2821 | | | | |
| HN2822 | | | | |
| HN2823 | | | | |
| HN2824 | Harmony | Robert Jefferson | 1978 | 1984 |
| HN2825 | Lady and the Unicorn | Robert Jefferson | 1982 | 1982 |
| HN2826 | Leda and the Swan | Robert Jefferson | 1983 | 1983 |
| HN2827 | Juno and the Peacock | Robert Jefferson | 1984 | 1984 |
| HN2828 | Europa and the Bull (Style Two) | Robert Jefferson | 1985 | 1985 |
| HN2829 | Diana the Huntress | Robert Jefferson | 1986 | 1986 |
| HN2830 | Indian Temple Dancer | Margaret Davies | 1977 | 1977 |
| HN2831 | Spanish Flamenco Dancer | Margaret Davies | 1977 | 1977 |
| HN2832 | Fair Lady (Red, White) | Margaret Davies | 1977 | 1996 |
| HN2833 | Sophie | Margaret Davies | 1977 | 1987 |
| HN2834 | Emma | Margaret Davies | 1977 | 1981 |
| HN2835 | Fair Lady | Margaret Davies | 1977 | 1996 |
| HN2836 | Polish Dancer | Margaret Davies | 1980 | 1980 |
| HN2837 | Awakening-Black | Margaret Davies | 1981 | 1997 |
| HN2838 | Sympathy | Margaret Davies | 1981 | 1986 |
| HN2839 | Nicola | Margaret Davies | 1978 | 1995 |
| HN2840 | Chinese Dancer | Margaret Davies | 1980 | 1980 |
| HN2841 | Mother and Daughter | Eric J Griffiths | 1981 | 1997 |
| HN2842 | Innocence - Red | Eric J Griffiths | 1979 | 1983 |
| HN2843 | Mother and Daughter | Eric J Griffiths | 1981 | 1992 |
| HN2844 | Sergeant Virginia 1st Regiment Continuental Light Dragoons, 1777 | Eric J Griffiths | 1978 | 1978 |
| HN2845 | Private Connecticut Regiment, 1777 | Eric J Griffiths | 1978 | 1978 |
| HN2846 | Private Pennsylvania Rifle Battalion, 1776 | Eric J Griffiths | 1978 | 1978 |
| HN2847 | | | | |
| HN2848 | | | | |
| HN2849 | | | | |
| HN2850 | | | | |
| HN2851 | Christmas Parcels | William K Harper | 1978 | 1982 |
| HN2852 | | | | |
| HN2853 | | | | |
| HN2854 | | | | |
| HN2855 | Embroidering | William K Harper | 1980 | 1990 |
| HN2856 | St George | William K Harper | 1978 | 1994 |
| HN2857 | Covent Garden | William K Harper | 1988 | 1990 |
| HN2858 | Doctor | William K Harper | 1979 | 1992 |
| HN2859 | Statesman | William K Harper | 1988 | 1990 |
| HN2860 | Sir John A MacDonald | William K Harper | 1987 | 1987 |
| HN2861 | George Washington At Prayer | L Ispansky | 1977 | 1977 |
| HN2862 | First Waltz | Margaret Davies | 1979 | 1983 |
| HN2863 | Lucy (Style One) | Margaret Davies | 1980 | 1984 |
| HN2864 | Tom | Margaret Davies | 1978 | 1981 |
| HN2865 | Tess | Margaret Davies | 1978 | 1983 |
| HN2866 | Mexican Dancer | Margaret Davies | 1979 | 1979 |
| HN2867 | Kurdish Dancer | Margaret Davies | 1979 | 1979 |
| HN2868 | Cleopatra | Margaret Davies | 1979 | 1979 |
| HN2869 | Louise (Style One) | Margaret Davies | 1979 | 1986 |
| HN2870 | Beth | Margaret Davies | 1979 | 1983 |
| HN2871 | Beat You To It | Margaret Davies | 1980 | 1987 |
| HN2872 | Young Master | Margaret Davies | 1980 | 1989 |
| HN2873 | The Bride (White and Gold) | Margaret Davies | 1980 | 1989 |
| HN2874 | Bridesmaid (White With Gold Trim) | Margaret Davies | 1980 | 1989 |
| HN2875 | Awakening-White | Margaret Davies | 1981 | 1997 |
| HN2876 | Sympathy | Margaret Davies | 1981 | 1986 |
| HN2877 | Wizard | Alan Maslankowski | 1978 | 2006 |
| HN2878 | Her Majesty Queen Elizabeth II | Eric J Griffiths | 1983 | 1983 |
| HN2879 | Gamekeeper | Eric J Griffiths | 1984 | 1992 |
| HN2880 | Monique | Eric J Griffiths | 1984 | 1984 |
| HN2881 | Lord Oliver as Richard III | Eric J Griffiths | 1985 | 1985 |
| HN2882 | Queen Elizabeth The Queen Mother 80th (lmt ed 1500) | | | |
| HN2883 | HRH The Prince Of Wales | William K Harper | 1981 | 1981 |
| HN2884 | Prince Charles – HRH The Prince Of Wales | Eric J Griffiths | 1981 | 1981 |
| HN2885 | Lady Diana Spencer | Eric J Griffiths | 1982 | 1982 |
| HN2886 | HRH Prince Philip – Duke of Edinburgh | | | |
| HN2887 | HRH The Princess of Wales | Eric J Griffiths | 1982 | 1982 |
| HN2888 | Pope John Paul II | Eric J Griffiths | 1982 | 1992 |
| HN2889 | Captain Cook | William K Harper | 1980 | 1984 |
| HN2890 | Clown | William K Harper | 1979 | 1988 |
| HN2891 | Newsvendor (Limited Edition 2500) | William K Harper | 1986 | 1986 |
| HN2892 | The Chief | William K Harper | 1978 | 1994 |
| HN2893 | | | | |
| HN2894 | Balloon Clown | William K Harper | 1986 | 1992 |
| HN2895 | Morning Ma'am | William K Harper | 1986 | 1989 |
| HN2896 | Good Day Sir | William K Harper | 1986 | 1989 |
| HN2897 | Francoise | William K Harper | 1984 | 1984 |
| HN2898 | Ko-Ko | William K Harper | 1980 | 1985 |
| HN2899 | Yum-Yum | William K Harper | 1980 | 1985 |

== HN2900 to 2999 ==
| # | Title | Designer(s) | From | To |
|---|---|---|---|---|
| HN2900 | Ruth – The Pirate Maid | William K Harper | 1981 | 1985 |
| HN2901 | Pirate King | William K Harper | 1981 | 1985 |
| HN2902 | Elsie Maynard | William K Harper | 1982 | 1985 |
| HN2903 | Colonel Fairfax | William K Harper | 1982 | 1985 |
| HN2906 | Paula | Pauline Parsons | 1980 | 1986 |
| HN2907 | Piper | M Abberley | 1980 | 1992 |
| HN2908 | HMS Ajax | S Keenan | 1980 | 1980 |
| HN2909 | Benmore | S Keenan | 1980 | 1980 |
| HN2910 | Lalla Rookh | S Keenan | 1981 | 1981 |
| HN2911 | Gandalf | D Lyttleton | 1980 | 1984 |
| HN2912 | Frodo | D Lyttleton | 1980 | 1984 |
| HN2913 | Gollum | D Lyttleton | 1980 | 1984 |
| HN2914 | Bilbo | D Lyttleton | 1980 | 1984 |
| HN2915 | Galadriel | D Lyttleton | 1981 | 1984 |
| HN2916 | Aragon | D Lyttleton | 1981 | 1984 |
| HN2917 | Legolas | D Lyttleton | 1981 | 1984 |
| HN2918 | Boromir | D Lyttleton | 1981 | 1984 |
| HN2919 | Rachel | Peter Gee | 1981 | 1984 |
| HN2920 | Yearning | Peter Gee | 1982 | 1986 |
| HN2921 | Yearning | Peter Gee | 1982 | 1986 |
| HN2922 | Gimli | D Lyttleton | 1981 | 1984 |
| HN2923 | Barliman Butterbur | D Lyttleton | 1982 | 1984 |
| HN2924 | Tom Bombadil | D Lyttleton | 1982 | 1984 |
| HN2925 | Samwise | D Lyttleton | 1982 | 1984 |
| HN2926 | Tom Sawyer | D Lyttleton | 1982 | 1985 |
| HN2927 | Huckleberry Finn | D Lyttleton | 1982 | 1985 |
| HN2928 | Nelson | S Keenan | 1981 | 1981 |
| HN2929 | Chieftain | S Keenan | 1982 | 1982 |
| HN2930 | Pocahontas | S Keenan | 1982 | 1982 |
| HN2931 | Mary – Queen of Scots | S Keenan | 1983 | 1983 |
| HN2932 | Hibernia | S Keenan | 1983 | 1983 |
| HN2933 | Kathleen | S Keenan | 1983 | 1987 |
| HN2934 | Balloon Boy | Peter Gee | 1984 | 1998 |
| HN2935 | Balloon Lady | Peter Gee | 1984 | Present |
| HN2936 | Rachel | Peter Gee | 1985 | 1997 |
| HN2937 | Gail | Peter Gee | 1986 | 1997 |
| HN2938 | Isadora | Peter Gee | 1986 | 1992 |
| HN2939 | Donna | Peter Gee | 1982 | 1994 |
| HN2940 | All Abroad | Robert Tabbenor | 1982 | 1986 |
| HN2941 | Tom Brown | Robert Tabbenor | 1983 | 1985 |
| HN2942 | Prized Possessions | Robert Tabbenor | 1982 | 1982 |
| HN2943 | China Repairer | Robert Tabbenor | 1982 | 1988 |
| HN2944 | Rag Doll Seller | Robert Tabbenor | 1983 | 1995 |
| HN2945 | Pride and Joy | Robert Tabbenor | 1984 | 1984 |
| HN2946 | Elizabeth | B Franks | 1982 | 1986 |
| HN2952 | Susan | Pauline Parsons | 1982 | 1993 |
| HN2953 | Sleeping Darling | Pauline Parsons | 1981 | 1981 |
| HN2954 | Samantha | Pauline Parsons | 1982 | 1984 |
| HN2955 | Nancy | Pauline Parsons | 1982 | 1994 |
| HN2956 | Heather | Pauline Parsons | 1982 | 2000 |
| HN2957 | Edith | Pauline Parsons | 1982 | 1985 |
| HN2958 | Amy | P Parsons | 1982 | 1987 |
| HN2959 | Save Some For Me | Pauline Parsons | 1982 | 1985 |
| HN2960 | Laura | Pauline Parsons | 1982 | 1994 |
| HN2961 | Carol | Pauline Parsons | 1982 | 1995 |
| HN2962 | Barbara | Pauline Parsons | 1982 | 1984 |
| HN2963 | It Won't Hurt | Pauline Parsons | 1982 | 1985 |
| HN2964 | Dressing Up | Pauline Parsons | 1982 | 1985 |
| HN2965 | Pollyanna | Pauline Parsons | 1982 | 1985 |
| HN2966 | And So To Bed | P Parsons | 1982 | 1985 |
| HN2967 | Please Keep Still | Pauline Parsons | 1982 | 1985 |
| HN2968 | Juliet | Pauline Parsons | 1983 | 1984 |
| HN2969 | Kimberly | Pauline Parsons | 1983 | 1984 |
| HN2970 | And One For You | Adrian Hughes | 1982 | 1985 |
| HN2971 | As Good As New | Adrian Hughes | 1982 | 1985 |
| HN2972 | Little Lord Fauntleroy | Adrian Hughes | 1982 | 1985 |
| HN2974 | Carolyn | Adrian Hughes | 1982 | 1986 |
| HN2975 | Heidi | Adrian Hughes | 1983 | 1985 |
| HN2976 | I'm Nearly Ready | Adrian Hughes | 1983 | 1985 |
| HN2977 | Magic Dragon | Adrian Hughes | 1983 | 1986 |
| HN2978 | Magpie Ring | Adrian Hughes | 1983 | 1986 |
| HN2979 | Fairyspell | Adrian Hughes | 1983 | 1986 |
| HN2980 | Just One More | Adrian Hughes | 1983 | 1985 |
| HN2981 | Stick ‘em Up | Adrian Hughes | 1983 | 1985 |
| HN2988 | Auctioneer | Robert Tabbenor | 1986 | 1986 |
| HN2989 | Genie | Robert Tabbenor | 1983 | 1990 |
| HN2990 | Shepherdess | Robert Tabbenor | 1987 | 1988 |
| HN2991 | June | Robert Tabbenor | 1988 | 1994 |
| HN2992 | Golfer | Robert Tabbenor | 1988 | 1991 |
| HN2993 | Old Father Thames | Robert Tabbenor | 1988 | 1988 |
| HN2994 | Helen | Robert Tabbenor | 1985 | 1987 |
| HN2995 | Julie | Robert Tabbenor | 1985 | 1995 |
| HN2996 | Amanda | Robert Tabbenor | 1986 | 2000 |
| HN2997 | Chic | Robert Tabbenor | 1987 | 1990 |
| HN2998 | Aperitif | Peter Gee | 1988 | 1988 |
| HN2999 | Genie | Robert Tabbenor | 1990 | 1995 |

== HN3000 to 3099 ==
| # | Title | Designer(s) | From | To |
|---|---|---|---|---|
| HN3000 | Sweet Bouquet | Robert Tabbenor | 1988 | 1988 |
| HN3001 | Danielle | Peter Gee | 1990 | 1995 |
| HN3002 | Marilyn | Peter Gee | 1985 | 1995 |
| HN3003 | Lilian in Summer | Peter Gee | 1985 | 1985 |
| HN3004 | Emily in Autumn | Peter Gee | 1986 | 1986 |
| HN3005 | Sarah in Winter | Peter Gee | 1986 | 1986 |
| HN3006 | Catherine in Spring | Peter Gee | 1985 | 1985 |
| HN3007 | Mary - Countess Howe | Peter Gee | 1990 | 1990 |
| HN3008 | Sophia Charlotte, Lady Sheffield | Peter Gee | 1990 | 1990 |
| HN3009 | The Hon. Frances Duncombe | Peter Gee | 1991 | 1991 |
| HN3010 | Isabella – Countess of Sefton | Peter Gee | 1990 | 1991 |
| HN3011 | My Best Friend | Peter Gee | 1990 | 2000 |
| HN3012 | Painting | Pauline Parsons | 1987 | 1987 |
| HN3013 | James | Pauline Parsons | 1983 | 1987 |
| HN3014 | Nell | Pauline Parsons | 1982 | 1987 |
| HN3015 | Adornment | Pauline Parsons | 1989 | 1989 |
| HN3016 | Graduate (Female) | Pauline Parsons | 1984 | 1992 |
| HN3017 | Graduate (Male) | Pauline Parsons | 1984 | 1992 |
| HN3018 | Sisters | Pauline Parsons | 1983 | Present |
| HN3019 | Sisters | Pauline Parsons | 1983 | 1997 |
| HN3020 | Ellen | Pauline Parsons | 1984 | 1987 |
| HN3021 | Polly Put The Kettle On | Pauline Parsons | 1984 | 1987 |
| HN3024 | April Shower | Robert Jefferson | 1983 | 1986 |
| HN3025 | Rumpelstilskin | Robert Jefferson | 1983 | 1986 |
| HN3026 | Carefree | Robert Jefferson | 1986 | 2001 |
| HN3027 | Windswept | Robert Jefferson | 1985 | 1994 |
| HN3028 | Panorama | Robert Jefferson | 1985 | 1988 |
| HN3029 | Carefree | Robert Jefferson | 1986 | 1997 |
| HN3030 | Little Bo Peep | Adrian Hughes | 1984 | 1987 |
| HN3031 | Wee Willie Winkie | Adrian Hughes | 1984 | 1987 |
| HN3032 | Tom, Tom, The Piper's Son | Adrian Hughes | 1984 | 1987 |
| HN3033 | Springtime | Adrian Hughes | 1983 | 1983 |
| HN3034 | Little Jack Horner | Adrian Hughes | 1984 | 1987 |
| HN3035 | Little Boy Blue | Adrian Hughes | 1984 | 1987 |
| HN3036 | Kerry | Adrian Hughes | 1986 | 1992 |
| HN3037 | Miranda | Adrian Hughes | 1987 | 1990 |
| HN3038 | Yvonne | Adrian Hughes | 1987 | 1992 |
| HN3039 | Reflection | Adrian Hughes | 1987 | 1991 |
| HN3040 | Flower Arranging | D Brindley | 1988 | 1988 |
| HN3041 | Lawyer | Pauline Parsons | 1985 | 1995 |
| HN3042 | Gillian (With Shoulder Straps) | Pauline Parsons | 1984 | |
| HN3042a | Gillian (Without Shoulder Straps) | Pauline Parsons | | 1990 |
| HN3043 | Lynsey | Pauline Parsons | 1985 | 1995 |
| HN3044 | Catherine | Pauline Parsons | 1985 | 1996 |
| HN3045 | Demure | Pauline Parsons | 1985 | 1988 |
| HN3046 | Debut | Pauline Parsons | 1985 | 1989 |
| HN3047 | Sharon | Pauline Parsons | 1984 | 1993 |
| HN3048 | Tapestry Weaving | Pauline Parsons | 1985 | 1985 |
| HN3049 | Writing | Pauline Parsons | 1986 | 1986 |
| HN3050 | Susan | Pauline Parsons | 1986 | 1995 |
| HN3051 | Country Girl | Adrian Hughes | 1987 | 1992 |
| HN3052 | A Winter's Walk | Adrian Hughes | 1987 | 1995 |
| HN3053 | Martine | Adrian Hughes | 1984 | 1984 |
| HN3054 | Dominique | Adrian Hughes | 1984 | 1984 |
| HN3055 | Cladine | Adrian Hughes | 1984 | 1984 |
| HN3056 | Danielle | Adrian Hughes | 1984 | 1984 |
| HN3057 | Sir Winston Churchill | Adrian Hughes | 1985 | Present |
| HN3058 | Andrea | Adrian Hughes | 1985 | 1995 |
| HN3059 | Sophistication | Adrian Hughes | 1987 | 1990 |
| HN3060 | Wintertime | Adrian Hughes | 1985 | 1985 |
| HN3061 | Hope | S Mitchell | 1984 | 1984 |
| HN3066 | Printemps | Robert Jefferson | 1987 | 1987 |
| HN3067 | Ete (Summer) | Robert Jefferson | 1989 | 1989 |
| HN3068 | Automne | Robert Jefferson | 1986 | 1986 |
| HN3069 | Hiver (Winter) | Robert Jefferson | 1988 | 1988 |
| HN3070 | Cocktails | Adrian Hughes | 1985 | 1995 |
| HN3071 | Flirtation | Adrian Hughes | 1985 | 1995 |
| HN3072 | Promenade | Adrian Hughes | 1995 | 1995 |
| HN3073 | Strolling | Adrian Hughes | 1985 | 1995 |
| HN3074 | Paradise | Adrian Hughes | 1985 | 1992 |
| HN3075 | Tango | Adrian Hughes | 1985 | 1992 |
| HN3076 | Bolero | Adrian Hughes | 1985 | 1992 |
| HN3077 | Windflower | Adrian Hughes | 1986 | 1992 |
| HN3078 | Dancing Delight | Adrian Hughes | 1986 | 1989 |
| HN3079 | Sleeping Beauty | Adrian Hughes | 1987 | 1989 |
| HN3080 | Allure | Eric J Griffiths | 1985 | 1988 |
| HN3082 | Faith | Eric J Griffiths | 1986 | 1986 |
| HN3083 | Sheikh | Eric J Griffiths | 1987 | 1989 |
| HN3084 | Havestime | Eric J Griffiths | 1988 | 1990 |
| HN3085 | Summer Rose | Eric J Griffiths | 1987 | 1992 |
| HN3086 | Duchess of York | Eric J Griffiths | 1986 | 1986 |
| HN3087 | Charity | Eric J Griffiths | 1987 | 1987 |
| HN3088 | Kate Hannigan | Eric J Griffiths | 1989 | 1989 |
| HN3089 | Grace Darling | Eric J Griffiths | 1987 | 1987 |
| HN3090 | Charisma | Pauline Parsons | 1986 | 1990 |
| HN3091 | Summer's Darling | Pauline Parsons | 1986 | 1995 |
| HN3092 | Cherry Blossom | Pauline Parsons | 1986 | 1989 |
| HN3093 | Morning Glory | Pauline Parsons | 1986 | 1989 |
| HN3094 | Sweet Perfume | Pauline Parsons | 1986 | 1995 |
| HN3095 | Happy Birthday | Pauline Parsons | 1987 | 1994 |
| HN3096 | Merry Christmas | Pauline Parsons | 1987 | 1992 |
| HN3097 | Happy Anniversary | Pauline Parsons | 1987 | 1993 |
| HN3098 | Dorothy | Pauline Parsons | 1987 | 1990 |
| HN3099 | Queen Elizabeth I | Pauline Parsons | 1986 | 1987 |

== HN3100 to 3199 ==
| # | Title | Designer(s) | From | To |
|---|---|---|---|---|
| HN3100 | Kathleen | Sharon Keenan | 1986 | 1986 |
| HN3105 | Love Letter | Robert Jefferson | 1986 | 1988 |
| HN3106 | Secret Moment | Robert Jefferson | 1986 | 1988 |
| HN3107 | Daybreak | Robert Jefferson | 1986 | 1988 |
| HN3108 | Enchanting Evening | Robert Jefferson | 1986 | 1992 |
| HN3109 | Pensive | Robert Jefferson | 1986 | 1988 |
| HN3110 | Enigma | Robert Jefferson | 1986 | 1995 |
| HN3111 | Robin Hood and Maid Marion | Robert Jefferson | 1994 | 1994 |
| HN3112 | Lancelot and Guinivere | Robert Jefferson | 1996 | 1996 |
| HN3113 | Romeo and Juliet | Robert Jefferson | 1993 | 1993 |
| HN3114 | Antony and Cleopatra | Robert Jefferson | 1995 | 1995 |
| HN3115 | Idle Hours | Alan Maslankowski | 1986 | 1988 |
| HN3116 | Park Parade | Alan Maslankowski | 1987 | 1994 |
| HN3117 | Indian Maiden | Alan Maslankowski | 1987 | 1990 |
| HN3118 | Lorraine | Alan Maslankowski | 1988 | 1995 |
| HN3119 | Partners | Alan Maslankowski | 1990 | 1992 |
| HN3120 | Spring Walk | Alan Maslankowski | 1990 | 1992 |
| HN3121 | Wizard | Alan Maslankowski | 1990 | 1995 |
| HN3122 | My First Pet | Alan Maslankowski | 1991 | 1997 |
| HN3123 | Sit | Alan Maslankowski | 1991 | 2000 |
| HN3124 | Thinking Of You | Alan Maslankowski | 1991 | 2001 |
| HN3125 | Queen Victoria | Pauline Parsons | 1987 | 1988 |
| HN3126 | Storytime | Pauline Parsons | 1987 | 1992 |
| HN3127 | Playmates | Pauline Parsons | 1987 | 1992 |
| HN3128 | Tomorrow's Dreams | Pauline Parsons | 1987 | 1992 |
| HN3129 | Thankful | Pauline Parsons | 1987 | 1999 |
| HN3130 | Sisterly Love | Pauline Parsons | 1987 | 1995 |
| HN3132 | Good Pals | Pauline Parsons | 1987 | 1992 |
| HN3133 | Dreaming | Pauline Parsons | 1987 | 1995 |
| HN3134 | Ballet Class | Pauline Parsons | 1987 | 1992 |
| HN3135 | Thankful | Pauline Parsons | 1987 | 1994 |
| HN3136 | Laura | Pauline Parsons | 1988 | 1988 |
| HN3137 | Summertime | Pauline Parsons | 1987 | 1987 |
| HN3138 | Eastern Grace | Pauline Parsons | 1988 | 1989 |
| HN3139 | Free As The Wind | Pauline Parsons | 1988 | 1995 |
| HN3140 | Gaiety | Pauline Parsons | 1988 | 1990 |
| HN3141 | Queen Anne | Pauline Parsons | 1988 | 1988 |
| HN3142 | Mary – Queen of Scots | Pauline Parsons | 1989 | 1989 |
| HN3143 | Rosemary | Pauline Parsons | 1988 | 1991 |
| HN3144 | Florence Nightingale | Pauline Parsons | 1988 | 1988 |
| HN3145 | Rose Arbour | D Brindley | 1987 | 1990 |
| HN3155 | Water Maiden | Adrian Hughes | 1987 | 1991 |
| HN3156 | Bathing Beauty | Adrian Hughes | 1987 | 1989 |
| HN3157 | Free Spirit | Adrian Hughes | 1987 | 1992 |
| HN3159 | Free Spirit | Adrian Hughes | 1987 | 1992 |
| HN3160 | Shepherd | Adrian Hughes | 1988 | 1989 |
| HN3161 | Gardener | Adrian Hughes | 1988 | 1991 |
| HN3162 | Breezy Day | Adrian Hughes | 1988 | 1990 |
| HN3163 | Country Maid | Adrian Hughes | 1988 | 1991 |
| HN3164 | Farmer's Wife | Adrian Hughes | 1988 | 1991 |
| HN3165 | August | Margaret Davies | 1987 | 1987 |
| HN3166 | September | Margaret Davies | 1987 | 1987 |
| HN3167 | Hazel | Margaret Davies | 1988 | 1991 |
| HN3168 | Jemma | Margaret Davies | 1988 | 1991 |
| HN3169 | Jessica | Margaret Davies | 1988 | 1995 |
| HN3170 | Caroline | Margaret Davies | 1988 | 1992 |
| HN3171 | Camille | Margaret Davies | 1987 | 1987 |
| HN3172 | Christine | Margaret Davies | 1987 | 1987 |
| HN3173 | Natalie | Margaret Davies | 1988 | 1996 |
| HN3174 | Southern Belle | Margaret Davies | 1988 | 1997 |
| HN3175 | Sweet Violets | Douglas Tootle | 1988 | 1989 |
| HN3176 | Young Dreams | Douglas Tootle | 1988 | 1992 |
| HN3177 | Harriet | Douglas Tootle | 1988 | 1991 |
| HN3178 | Polly | Douglas Tootle | 1988 | 1991 |
| HN3179 | Eliza | Douglas Tootle | 1988 | 1992 |
| HN3180 | Phyllis | Douglas Tootle | 1988 | 1991 |
| HN3181 | Moondancer | Douglas Tootle | 1988 | 1990 |
| HN3182 | Stargazer | Douglas Tootle | 1988 | 1990 |
| HN3183 | Tumbler | Douglas Tootle | 1989 | 1991 |
| HN3184 | Joy | Douglas Tootle | 1988 | 1990 |
| HN3185 | Traveller's Tale | Eric J Griffiths | 1988 | 1989 |
| HN3186 | Entranced | Eric J Griffiths | 1988 | 1989 |
| HN3187 | Balloons | Eric J Griffiths | 1988 | 1988 |
| HN3188 | Debutante | Eric J Griffiths | 1988 | 1988 |
| HN3189 | HM Queen Elizabeth – The Queen Mother | Eric J Griffiths | 1990 | 1990 |
| HN3190 | Old Ben | Mary Nicoll | 1990 | 1990 |
| HN3191 | Brothers | Eric J Griffiths | 1991 | 2007 |
| HN3192 | Mantilla | Eric J Griffiths | 1992 | 1992 |
| HN3195 | Farmer | Adrian Hughes | 1988 | 1991 |
| HN3196 | Joker | Adrian Hughes | 1988 | 1990 |
| HN3197 | Ballerina | Adrian Hughes | 1988 | 1988 |
| HN3198 | Vanessa | Adrian Hughes | 1989 | 1990 |
| HN3199 | Maxine | Adrian Hughes | 1989 | 1990 |

== HN3200 to 3299 ==
| # | Title | Designer(s) | From | To |
|---|---|---|---|---|
| HN3200 | Gloria | Adrian Hughes | 1989 | 1990 |
| HN3201 | Liberty | Adrian Hughes | 1989 | 1990 |
| HN3202 | Boy Evacuee | Adrian Hughes | 1989 | 1989 |
| HN3203 | Girl Evacuee | Adrian Hughes | 1989 | 1989 |
| HN3204 | Emily | Adrian Hughes | 1989 | 1994 |
| HN3205 | Veronica | Adrian Hughes | 1989 | 1992 |
| HN3206 | Teresa | Adrian Hughes | 1989 | 1992 |
| HN3207 | Louise | Adrian Hughes | 1990 | 1996 |
| HN3208 | Emma | Adrian Hughes | 1988 | 1990 |
| HN3209 | Claire | Adrian Hughes | 1990 | 1992 |
| HN3210 | Christening Day | P A Northcroft | 1988 | 1990 |
| HN3211 | Christening Day | P A Northcroft | 1988 | 1990 |
| HN3212 | Christmas Morn | Margaret Davies | 1988 | 1998 |
| HN3213 | Kirsty | Margaret Davies | 1988 | 1997 |
| HN3214 | Elaine | Margaret Davies | 1988 | 1998 |
| HN3215 | Ninette | Margaret Davies | 1988 | 1997 |
| HN3216 | Fair Lady | Margaret Davies | 1988 | 1995 |
| HN3217 | Joan | Margaret Davies | 1988 | 1988 |
| HN3218 | Sunday Best | Margaret Davies | 1988 | 1993 |
| HN3219 | Sara | Margaret Davies | 1988 | 1998 |
| HN3220 | Fragrance | Margaret Davies | 1988 | 1992 |
| HN3221 | Country Rose | Margaret Davies | 1989 | 2000 |
| HN3222 | Kelly | Margaret Davies | 1989 | 1989 |
| HN3223 | Pamela | Margaret Davies | 1989 | 1989 |
| HN3228 | Devotion | Pauline Parsons | 1989 | 1995 |
| HN3229 | Geisha | Pauline Parsons | 1989 | 1989 |
| HN3230 | HM Queen Elizabeth – The Queen Mother as the Duchess of York | Pauline Parsons | 1989 | 1989 |
| HN3231 | Autumntime | Pauline Parsons | 1989 | 1989 |
| HN3232 | Anne Boleyn | Pauline Parsons | 1990 | 1990 |
| HN3233 | Catherine of Aragon | Pauline Parsons | 1990 | 1990 |
| HN3234 | Paula | Pauline Parsons | 1990 | 1996 |
| HN3235 | Mother and Child | Pauline Parsons | 1991 | 1993 |
| HN3236 | Falstaff | Charles J Noke | 1989 | 1990 |
| HN3244 | Southern Belle | Margaret Davies | 1989 | 1996 |
| HN3245 | Christmas Morn | Margaret Davies | 1991 | 1996 |
| HN3246 | Kirsty | Margaret Davies | 1989 | 1996 |
| HN3247 | Elaine | Margaret Davies | 1989 | 1996 |
| HN3248 | Ninette | Margaret Davies | 1989 | 1996 |
| HN3249 | Sara | Margaret Davies1989 | 1996 | |
| HN3250 | Fragrance | Margaret Davies | 1989 | 1992 |
| HN3251 | May | D V Tootle | 1989 | 1989 |
| HN3252 | Fiona | D V Tootle | 1989 | 1992 |
| HN3253 | Cheryl | D V Tootle | 1989 | 1994 |
| HN3254 | Happy Anniversary | D V Tootle | 1989 | Present |
| HN3255 | Madeleine | D V Tootle | 1989 | 1992 |
| HN3256 | Queen Victoria and Prince Albert | D V Tootle | 1990 | 1990 |
| HN3257 | Sophie | D V Tootle | 1990 | 1992 |
| HN3258 | Dawn | D V Tootle | 1990 | 1992 |
| HN3259 | Ann | D V Tootle | 1990 | 1996 |
| HN3260 | Jane | D V Tootle | 1990 | 1993 |
| HN3261 | Town Crier | Margaret Davies | 1989 | 1991 |
| HN3262 | Good King Wenceslas | Margaret Davies | 1989 | 1992 |
| HN3263 | Beatrice | Margaret Davies | 1989 | 1998 |
| HN3264 | Alison | Margaret Davies | 1989 | 1993 |
| HN3265 | Lisa | Margaret Davies | 1989 | 1995 |
| HN3266 | Diana | Margaret Davies | 1990 | 1990 |
| HN3267 | Salome | Margaret Davies | 1990 | 1990 |
| HN3268 | Buttercup | Margaret Davies | 1990 | 1998 |
| HN3269 | Christine | Margaret Davies | 1990 | 1994 |
| HN3270 | Karen | Margaret Davies | 1990 | 1995 |
| HN3271 | Guy Fawkes | Charles J Noke | 1989 | 1994 |
| HN3272 | Dick Turpin | G Tongue | 1989 | 1989 |
| HN3273 | Annabel | Robert Tabbenor | 1989 | 1992 |
| HN3274 | Over the Threshold | Robert Tabbenor | 1989 | 1998 |
| HN3275 | Will He, Won't He | Robert Tabbenor | 1990 | 1994 |
| HN3276 | Teeing Off | Robert Tabbenor | 1990 | 1997 |
| HN3277 | Carpet Seller (Seated) | Robert Tabbenor | 1990 | 1995 |
| HN3278 | Lamp Seller | Robert Tabbenor | 1990 | 1995 |
| HN3279 | Winning Put | Robert Tabbenor | 1991 | 1995 |
| HN3280 | Bridesmaid | Robert Tabbenor | 1991 | 1999 |
| HN3281 | Bride and Groom | Robert Tabbenor | 1991 | 2000 |
| HN3282 | First Steps | Robert Tabbenor | 1991 | 2001 |
| HN3283 | Tumbling | D V Tootle | 1990 | 1994 |
| HN3284 | Bride | D V Tootle | 1990 | 1997 |
| HN3285 | Bride | D V Tootle | 1990 | 1996 |
| HN3286 | Alexandra | D V Tootle | 1990 | 2000 |
| HN3287 | Harlequin | D V Tootle | 1993 | 1993 |
| HN3288 | Columbine | D V Tootle | 1993 | 1993 |
| HN3289 | Tumbling | D V Tootle | 1991 | 1991 |
| HN3290 | Lauren | D V Tootle | 1992 | 1992 |
| HN3291 | Tracy | D V Tootle | 1993 | 1999 |
| HN3292 | Alexandra | D V Tootle | 1994 | 2002 |
| HN3293 | Tip Toe | Adrian Hughes | 1990 | 1994 |
| HN3294 | Daddy's Joy | Adrian Hughes | 1990 | 1990 |
| HN3295 | Homecoming | Adrian Hughes | 1990 | 1990 |
| HN3296 | Fantasy | Adrian Hughes | 1990 | 1992 |
| HN3297 | Milestone | Adrian Hughes | 1990 | 1994 |
| HN3298 | Hold Tight | Adrian Hughes | 1990 | 1993 |
| HN3299 | Welcome Home | Adrian Hughes | 1991 | 1991 |

== HN3300 to 3399 ==
| # | Title | Designer(s) | From | To |
|---|---|---|---|---|
| HN3300 | Dressing Up | Adrian Hughes | 1991 | 1991 |
| HN3301 | Santa's Helper | Adrian Hughes | 1991 | 1995 |
| HN3302 | Please Sir | Adrian Hughes | 1992 | 1992 |
| HN3303 | Tender Moment | Margaret Davies | 1990 | 1997 |
| HN3304 | Samantha | Margaret Davies | 1990 | 1996 |
| HN3305 | Kathy | Margaret Davies | 1990 | 1996 |
| HN3306 | Megan | Margaret Davies | 1991 | 1994 |
| HN3307 | Elaine | Margaret Davies | 1990 | 2000 |
| HN3308 | Sara | Margaret Davies | 1990 | 1996 |
| HN3309 | Summer Rose | Margaret Davies | 1991 | 1997 |
| HN3310 | Diana | Margaret Davies | 1991 | 1995 |
| HN3311 | Fragrance | Margaret Davies | 1991 | 1991 |
| HN3312 | Sunday Best | Margaret Davies | 1991 | 1993 |
| HN3313 | Morning Breeze | Peter Gee | 1990 | 1994 |
| HN3314 | Confucius | Peter Gee | 1990 | 1995 |
| HN3315 | Waiting For A Train | Peter Gee | 1991 | 1991 |
| HN3316 | Amy | Peter Gee | 1991 | 1991 |
| HN3317 | Countess of Harrington | Peter Gee | 1992 | 1992 |
| HN3318 | Lady Worsley | Peter Gee | 1991 | 1991 |
| HN3319 | Mrs. Hugh Bonfoy | Peter Gee | 1992 | 1992 |
| HN3320 | Countess Spencer | Peter Gee | 1993 | 1993 |
| HN3321 | Gail | Peter Gee | 1992 | 1997 |
| HN3322 | Celeste | Peter Gee | 1992 | 1992 |
| HN3323 | June | Robert Tabbenor | 1990 | 2004 |
| HN3324 | July | Robert Tabbenor | 1990 | 2004 |
| HN3325 | August | Robert Tabbenor | 1990 | 2004 |
| HN3326 | September | Robert Tabbenor | 1990 | 2004 |
| HN3327 | October | Robert Tabbenor | 1990 | 2004 |
| HN3328 | November | Robert Tabbenor | 1990 | 2004 |
| HN3329 | December | Robert Tabbenor | 1990 | 2004 |
| HN3330 | January | Robert Tabbenor | 1990 | 2004 |
| HN3331 | February | Robert Tabbenor | 1990 | 2004 |
| HN3332 | March | Robert Tabbenor | 1990 | 2004 |
| HN3333 | April | Robert Tabbenor | 1990 | 2004 |
| HN3334 | May | Robert Tabbenor | 1990 | 2004 |
| HN3335 | Jester | Charles J Noke | 1990 | 1990 |
| HN3336 | Fair Lady | Margaret Davies | 1991 | 1994 |
| HN3337 | Christine | Margaret Davies | 1991 | 1994 |
| HN3338 | Karen | Margaret Davies | 1991 | 1994 |
| HN3339 | Olivia | Margaret Davies | 1992 | 1992 |
| HN3340 | Kay | Margaret Davies | 1991 | 1991 |
| HN3341 | January | Margaret Davies | 1991 | 1991 |
| HN3342 | February | Margaret Davies | 1991 | 1991 |
| HN3343 | March | Margaret Davies | 1991 | 1991 |
| HN3344 | April | Margaret Davies | 1991 | 1991 |
| HN3345 | May | Margaret Davies | 1991 | 1991 |
| HN3346 | June | Margaret Davies | 1991 | 1991 |
| HN3347 | July | Margaret Davies | 1991 | 1991 |
| HN3348 | Mother and Child | Pauline Parsons | 1991 | 1993 |
| HN3349 | Jane Seymour | Pauline Parsons | 1991 | 1991 |
| HN3350 | Henry VIII | Pauline Parsons | 1991 | 1991 |
| HN3351 | Congratulations | Peter Gee | 1991 | Present |
| HN3353 | Mother and Child | Pauline Parsons | 1992 | 1999 |
| HN3354 | Yours Forever | Pauline Parsons | 1992 | 1997 |
| HN3355 | Just For You | Pauline Parsons | 1992 | 1998 |
| HN3356 | Anne of Cleves | Pauline Parsons | 1991 | 1991 |
| HN3357 | Marie | Pauline Parsons | 1992 | 1992 |
| HN3358 | Loyal Friend | Valerie Annand | 1991 | 1995 |
| HN3359 | L'Ambitieuse | Valerie Annand | 1991 | 1991 |
| HN3360 | Katie | Valerie Annand | 1992 | 1997 |
| HN3361 | First Steps | Valerie Annand | 1992 | 1992 |
| HN3362 | Well Done | Valerie Annand | 1992 | 1992 |
| HN3363 | Peek A Boo | Valerie Annand | 1992 | 1992 |
| HN3364 | What Fun | Valerie Annand | 1992 | 1992 |
| HN3365 | Patricia | Valerie Annand | 1993 | 1993 |
| HN3366 | Wimbledon | Valerie Annand | 1995 | 1995 |
| HN3367 | Henley | Valerie Annand | 1993 | 1993 |
| HN3368 | Alice | Nada Pedley | 1991 | 1996 |
| HN3369 | Hannah | Nada Pedley | 1991 | 1996 |
| HN3370 | Bunny's Bedtime | Nada Pedley | 1991 | 1991 |
| HN3371 | Puppy Love | Nada Pedley | 1991 | 1991 |
| HN3372 | Making Friends | Nada Pedley | 1991 | 1991 |
| HN3373 | Feeding Time | Nada Pedley | 1991 | 1991 |
| HN3374 | Linda | Nada Pedley | 1990 | 1995 |
| HN3375 | Mary | Nada Pedley | 1992 | 1992 |
| HN3376 | Single Red Rose | Nada Pedley | 1992 | 1995 |
| HN3377 | First Outing | Nada Pedley | 1992 | 1992 |
| HN3378 | Summer's Day | Tim Potts | 1991 | 1996 |
| HN3379 | Kimberley | Tim Potts | 1992 | 1997 |
| HN3380 | Sarah | Timothy Potts | 1993 | 1993 |
| HN3381 | Maria | Tim Potts | 1993 | 1999 |
| HN3382 | Kimberley | Tim Potts | 1993 | 1996 |
| HN3383 | Sally | Tim Potts | 1995 | 1997 |
| HN3384 | Sarah | Tim Potts | 1995 | 2000 |
| HN3388 | Forget Me Not | Alan Maslankowski | 1999 | 2002 |
| HN3389 | Loving You | Alan Maslankowski | 1991 | 2004 |
| HN3390 | Thank You | Alan Maslankowski | 1991 | 2004 |
| HN3391 | Reward | Alan Maslankowski | 1992 | 1996 |
| HN3392 | Christopher Columbus | Alan Maslankowski | 1992 | 1992 |
| HN3393 | With Love | Alan Maslankowski | 1992 | 2004 |
| HN3394 | Sweet Dreams | Alan Maslankowski | 1992 | 1998 |
| HN3395 | Little Ballerina | Alan Maslankowski | 1992 | 2003 |
| HN3396 | Buddies | Alan Maslankowski | 1992 | 1996 |
| HN3397 | Let's Play | Alan Maslankowski | 1992 | 1996 |
| HN3398 | Ace | Robert Tabbenor | 1991 | 1995 |
| HN3399 | Father Christmas | Robert Tabbenor | 1992 | 1999 |

== HN3400 to 3499 ==
| # | Title | Designer(s) | From | To |
|---|---|---|---|---|
| HN3400 | God Bless You | Robert Tabbenor | 1992 | Present |
| HN3401 | Gardening Time | Robert Tabbenor | 1992 | 1994 |
| HN3402 | Samurai Warrior | Robert Tabbenor | 1992 | 1992 |
| HN3403 | Lt. General Ulysses S Grant | Robert Tabbenor | 1993 | 1993 |
| HN3404 | General Robert E Lee | Robert Tabbenor | 2003 | 2003 |
| HN3405 | Field Marshal Montgomery | Robert Tabbenor | 1994 | 1994 |
| HN3406 | Amanda | Robert Tabbenor | 1993 | 1999 |
| HN3407 | Julie | Robert Tabbenor | 1993 | 1999 |
| HN3408 | August | Margaret Davies | 1991 | 1991 |
| HN3409 | September | Margaret Davies | 1991 | 1991 |
| HN3410 | October | Margaret Davies | 1991 | 1991 |
| HN3411 | November | Margaret Davies | 1991 | 1991 |
| HN3412 | December | Margaret Davies | 1991 | 1991 |
| HN3413 | Kathryn | Margaret Davies | 1992 | 1992 |
| HN3414 | Rebecca | Margaret Davies | 1992 | 1997 |
| HN3415 | Janette | Margaret Davies | 1992 | 1992 |
| HN3416 | Victoria | Margaret Davies | 1992 | 1992 |
| HN3417 | Ninette | Margaret Davies | 1992 | 1992 |
| HN3418 | Bedtime | Nada Pedley | 1992 | 1992 |
| HN3419 | Angela | Nada Pedley | 1992 | 1992 |
| HN3420 | Ashley | Nada Pedley | 1992 | 1997 |
| HN3421 | Nicole | Nada Pedley | 1993 | 1997 |
| HN3422 | Joanne | Nada Pedley | 1993 | 1998 |
| HN3423 | Birthday Girl | Nada Pedley | 1993 | 2000 |
| HN3424 | My First Figurine | Nada Pedley | 1993 | 1998 |
| HN3425 | Almost Grown | Nada Pedley | 1993 | 1997 |
| HN3426 | Best Wishes | Nada Pedley | 1993 | 1995 |
| HN3427 | Gift of Love | Nada Pedley | 1993 | 2000 |
| HN3428 | Discovery | A Munslow | 1992 | 1992 |
| HN3429 | Napoleon at Waterloo | Alan Maslankowski | 1992 | 1992 |
| HN3430 | Sit | Alan Maslankowski | 1992 | 1996 |
| HN3431 | Little Ballerina | Alan Maslankowski | 1993 | 1993 |
| HN3432 | Duke of Washington | Alan Maslankowski | 1993 | 1993 |
| HN3433 | Winston S Churchill | Alan Maslankowski | 1993 | 1993 |
| HN3434 | Ballet Shoes | Alan Maslankowski | 1993 | 2001 |
| HN3435 | Daddy's Girl | Alan Maslankowski | 1993 | 1998 |
| HN3436 | HM Queen Elizabeth II | Alan Maslankowski | 1992 | 1992 |
| HN3437 | Mary | Alan Maslankowski | 1993 | 1996 |
| HN3438 | Joseph | Alan Maslankowski | 1993 | 1996 |
| HN3439 | Skater | Peter Gee | 1992 | 1997 |
| HN3440 | Her Majesty Queen Elizabeth II | Peter A. Gee | 1992 | 1992 |
| HN3441 | Barbara | Peter Gee | 1993 | 1993 |
| HN3442 | Eliza Farren, Countess of Derby | Peter Gee | 1992 | 1993 |
| HN3443 | Gift of Freedom | Peter Gee | 1993 | 2007 |
| HN3444 | Piper | Peter Gee | 1993 | 1993 |
| HN3445 | Amy's Sister | Peter Gee | 1993 | 1996 |
| HN3446 | Spring Song | Peter Gee | 1993 | 1996 |
| HN3447 | Jennifer | Peter Gee | 1994 | 1994 |
| HN3448 | Charles Dickens | Peter Gee | 1994 | 1994 |
| HN3449 | Catherine Howard | Pauline Parsons | 1992 | 1992 |
| HN3450 | Catherine Parr | Peter Gee | 1992 | 1992 |
| HN3451 | Catherine | Pauline Parsons | 1993 | 1999 |
| HN3452 | Our First Christmas | Pauline Parsons | 1993 | 1998 |
| HN3453 | Juliet | Pauline Parsons | 1994 | 1994 |
| HN3454 | Flowers for Mother | Pauline Parsons | 1994 | 1997 |
| HN3455 | Sharon | Pauline Parsons | 1994 | 1999 |
| HN3456 | Grandpa's Story | Pauline Parsons | 1994 | 2000 |
| HN3457 | When I Was Young | Pauline Parsons | 1994 | 2000 |
| HN3458 | Henry VIII | Pauline Parsons | 1994 | 1994 |
| HN3459 | King Charles | Charles J Noke | 1992 | 1992 |
| HN3460 | Brother and Sister | Adrian Hughes | 1993 | 2005 |
| HN3461 | Kerry | Adrian Hughes | 1993 | 1999 |
| HN3462 | Boy Scout | Adrian Hughes | 1994 | 1994 |
| HN3464 | Flambe Elephants Motherhood (Images of Fire) | Adrian Hughes | 1995 | 1997 |
| HN3470 | Croquet | Valerie Annand | 1994 | 1994 |
| HN3471 | Ascot | Valerie Annand | 1994 | 1994 |
| HN3472 | La Loge | Valerie Annand | 1992 | 1992 |
| HN3473 | Les Parapluies | Valerie Annand | 1993 | 1993 |
| HN3474 | Lise | Valerie Annand | 1994 | 1994 |
| HN3475 | Marie Sisley | Valerie Annand | 1994 | 1994 |
| HN3476 | Bridesmaid | Valerie Annand | 1994 | 1997 |
| HN3477 | Springtime | Valerie Annand | 1993 | 1996 |
| HN3478 | Summertime | Valerie Annand | 1994 | 1996 |
| HN3479 | Flowergirl | Valerie Annand | 1994 | 1997 |
| HN3480 | Kirsty | Margaret Davies | 1993 | 1997 |
| HN3481 | Lavender Rose | Margaret Davies | 1993 | 1995 |
| HN3482 | Old Country Roses | Margaret Davies | 1993 | 1995 |
| HN3483 | Moonlight Rose | Margaret Davies | 1993 | 1995 |
| HN3484 | Jesus | Alan Maslankowski | 1993 | 1996 |
| HN3485 | Mary | Alan Maslankowski | 1993 | 1996 |
| HN3486 | Joseph | Alan Maslankowski | 1993 | 1996 |
| HN3487 | Jesus | Alan Maslankowski | 1993 | 1996 |
| HN3488 | Christmas Day | Alan Maslankowski | 1993 | 1999 |
| HN3489 | Vice Admiral Lord Nelson | Alan Maslankowski | 1993 | 1993 |
| HN3490 | Thinking Of You | Alan Maslankowski | 1993 | 1993 |
| HN3491 | Friendship | Alan Maslankowski | 1994 | 2004 |
| HN3492 | With Love | Alan Maslankowski | 1994 | 1997 |
| HN3493 | Christmas Parcels | Alan Maslankowski | 1994 | 1998 |
| HN3494 | Tina | Margaret Davies | 1993 | 1993 |
| HN3495 | Annette | Margaret Davies | 1993 | 1993 |
| HN3496 | Margaret | Margaret Davies | 1993 | 1999 |
| HN3497 | Jessica | Margaret Davies | 1993 | 1993 |
| HN3498 | Natalie | Margaret Davies | 1993 | 1999 |
| HN3499 | Top ‘O The Hill | Leslie Harradine | 1993 | 1998 |

== HN3500 to 3599 ==
| # | Title | Designer(s) | From | To |
|---|---|---|---|---|
| HN3500 | | | | |
| HN3501 | | | | |
| HN3502 | | | | |
| HN3503 | | | | |
| HN3504 | | | | |
| HN3505 | | | | |
| HN3506 | | | | |
| HN3507 | | | | |
| HN3508 | | | | |
| HN3509 | | | | |
| HN3510 | | | | |
| HN3511 | | | | |
| HN3512 | | | | |
| HN3513 | | | | |
| HN3514 | Greater Scaup (male) | Lem Ward | | |
| HN3515 | | | | |
| HN3516 | | | | |
| HN3517 | | | | |
| HN3518 | | | | |
| HN3519 | | | | |
| HN3520 | | | | |
| HN3521 | | | | |
| HN3522 | The Leap | | 1982 | |
| HN3523 | | | | |
| HN3524 | | | | |
| HN3525 | Courtship | | 1982 | 2003 |
| HN3526 | | | | |
| HN3527 | | | | |
| HN3528 | | | | |
| HN3529 | | | | |
| HN3530 | | | | |
| HN3531 | | | | |
| HN3532 | | | | |
| HN3533 | | | | |
| HN3534 | | | | |
| HN3535 | | | | |
| HN3536 | | | | |
| HN3537 | | | | |
| HN3538 | | | | |
| HN3539 | | | | |
| HN3540 | | | | |
| HN3541 | | | | |
| HN3542 | | | | |
| HN3543 | Images of Nature "Friendship" Borzoi + Siamese Cat (White, 8" tall) | John R Ablitt | 1989 | |
| HN3544 | | | | |
| HN3545 | | | | |
| HN3546 | | | | |
| HN3547 | Pegasus | Allan Maslankowski | 1990 | 1993 |
| HN3548 | Unicorn | Allan Maslankowski | 1991 | 1993 |
| HN3549 | | | | |
| HN3550 | Images of Nature "Always and Forever" (two birds, white, 4.5" tall) | Adrian Hughes | 1993 | |
| HN3551 | | | | |
| HN3552 | Dragon | Robert F. Tabbenor | 1993 | |
| HN3553 | | | | |
| HN3554 | | | | |
| HN3555 | | | | |
| HN3556 | | | | |
| HN3557 | | | | |
| HN3558 | | | | |
| HN3559 | | | | |
| HN3560 | | | | |
| HN3561 | | | | |
| HN3562 | | | | |
| HN3563 | | | | |
| HN3564 | | | | |
| HN3565 | | | | |
| HN3566 | | | | |
| HN3567 | | | | |
| HN3568 | | | | |
| HN3569 | | | | |
| HN3570 | | | | |
| HN3571 | | | | |
| HN3572 | | | | |
| HN3573 | | | | |
| HN3574 | | | | |
| HN3575 | | | | |
| HN3576 | | | | |
| HN3577 | | | | |
| HN3578 | | | | |
| HN3579 | | | | |
| HN3580 | | | | |
| HN3581 | | | | |
| HN3582 | | | | |
| HN3583 | | | | |
| HN3584 | | | | |
| HN3585 | | | | |
| HN3586 | | | | |
| HN3587 | | | | |
| HN3588 | | | | |
| HN3589 | | | | |
| HN3590 | | | | |
| HN3591 | | | | |
| HN3592 | | | | |
| HN3593 | | | | |
| HN3594 | | | | |
| HN3595 | | | | |
| HN3596 | | | | |
| HN3597 | | | | |
| HN3598 | | | | |
| HN3599 | | | | |

== HN3600 to 3699 ==
| # | Title | Designer(s) | From | To |
|---|---|---|---|---|
| HN3600 | Dawn | Nada Pedley | 1993 | 1998 |
| HN3601 | Helen | Nada Pedley | 1993 | 2002 |
| HN3602 | Flowergirl | Nada Pedley | 1993 | 1996 |
| HN3603 | Sharon | Nada Pedley | 1994 | 1994 |
| HN3604 | Diane | Nada Pedley | 1994 | 1994 |
| HN3605 | First Performance | Nada Pedley | 1994 | 1998 |
| HN3606 | A Posy For You | Nada Pedley | 1994 | 1997 |
| HN3607 | Special Friend | Nada Pedley | 1994 | 1998 |
| HN3608 | Good Companion | Nada Pedley | 1994 | 1999 |
| HN3609 | Kathleen | Nada Pedley | 1994 | 2000 |
| HN3610 | Summer Serenade | Margaret Davies | 1993 | 1996 |
| HN3611 | Winter Welcome | Margaret Davies | 1993 | 1996 |
| HN3612 | Autumn Attraction | Margaret Davies | 1993 | 1996 |
| HN3613 | Darling | C Vyse | 1993 | 1993 |
| HN3617 | Monica | Leslie Harradine | 1993 | 1999 |
| HN3618 | Dinky Doo | Leslie Harradine | 1994 | 2002 |
| HN3620 | Valerie | Margaret Davies | 1994 | 1999 |
| HN3621 | Autumntime | Valerie Annand | 1994 | 1996 |
| HN3622 | Wintertime | Valerie Annand | 1995 | 1996 |
| HN3623 | Lady Eaton | Valerie Annand | 1994 | 1994 |
| HN3624 | Janice | Valerie Annand | 1994 | 1997 |
| HN3625 | Anniversary | Valerie Annand | 1994 | 1996 |
| HN3626 | Lily | Valerie Annand | 1995 | 1995 |
| HN3627 | England | Valerie Annand | 1996 | 1998 |
| HN3628 | Ireland | Valerie Annand | 1996 | 1998 |
| HN3629 | Scotland | Valerie Annand | 1995 | 1998 |
| HN3630 | Wales | Valerie Annand | 1995 | 1998 |
| HN3631 | Beatrice | Margaret Davies | 1994 | 1998 |
| HN3632 | Amanda | Robert Tabbenor | 1994 | 1996 |
| HN3633 | Shakespeare | Robert Tabbenor | 1994 | 1994 |
| HN3634 | Amanda | Robert Tabbenor | 1995 | 1995 |
| HN3635 | Amanda | Robert Tabbenor | 1995 | 1995 |
| HN3636 | Captain Hook | Robert Tabbenor | 1993 | 1996 |
| HN3637 | Dick Turpin | Robert Tabbenor | 1993 | 1996 |
| HN3638 | D'Artagnan | Robert Tabbenor | 1993 | 1996 |
| HN3639 | Sherlock Holmes | Robert Tabbenor | 1995 | 1996 |
| HN3640 | W G Grace | Robert Tabbenor | 1995 | 1995 |
| HN3641 | Robert Burns | Robert Tabbenor | 1996 | 1998 |
| HN3642 | Moor | Charles J Noke | 1994 | 1995 |
| HN3643 | Pauline | Nada Pedley | 1994 | 1994 |
| HN3644 | Deborah | Nada Pedley | 1995 | 1995 |
| HN3645 | Lindsay | Nada Pedley | 1994 | 1998 |
| HN3646 | Claire | Nada Pedley | 1994 | 2000 |
| HN3647 | Holly | Nada Pedley | 1994 | 2000 |
| HN3648 | Sweet Sixteen | Nada Pedley | 1994 | 1998 |
| HN3649 | Hannah | Nada Pedley | 1994 | 1998 |
| HN3650 | Mother's Helper | Nada Pedley | 1994 | 2000 |
| HN3651 | Hello Daddy | Nada Pedley | 1994 | 2000 |
| HN3652 | First Recital | Nada Pedley | 1994 | 1996 |
| HN3653 | Lucy | Margaret Davies | 1994 | 1997 |
| HN3654 | Young Melody | Nada Pedley | 1994 | 1996 |
| HN3655 | Hannah | Nada Pedley | 1995 | 1995 |
| HN3656 | Pauline | Nada Pedley | 1994 | 1994 |
| HN3657 | Quiet They're Sleeping | Nada Pedley | 1994 | 1997 |
| HN3658 | Charlotte | Nada Pedley | 1995 | 1996 |
| HN3659 | Miss Kay | Nada Pedley | 1994 | 1994 |
| HN3660 | Happy Birthday | Nada Pedley | 1995 | 1999 |
| HN3661 | Gemma | Nada Pedley | 1995 | 1998 |
| HN3662 | Take Me Home | Nada Pedley | 1995 | 1999 |
| HN3663 | Special Treat | Nada Pedley | 1995 | 1997 |
| HN3664 | Wistful | Peter Gee | 1994 | 2002 |
| HN3665 | Tomorrow's Dream | Peter Gee | 1995 | Present |
| HN3674 | Ophelia | Pauline Parsons | 1995 | 1995 |
| HN3675 | Richard the Lionheart | Pauline Parsons | 1995 | 2002 |
| HN3676 | Desdemona | Pauline Parsons | 1995 | 1995 |
| HN3677 | Cinderella | Pauline Parsons | 1995 | 1995 |
| HN3678 | Snow White | Pauline Parsons | 1995 | 1995 |
| HN3679 | Titania | Pauline Parsons | 1995 | 1995 |
| HN3680 | Lady Jane Grey | Pauline Parsons | 1995 | 1995 |
| HN3681 | Joan of Arc | Pauline Parsons | 1996 | 1998 |
| HN3682 | Princess Elizabeth | Pauline Parsons | 1996 | 1996 |
| HN3683 | Eastern Grace | Pauline Parsons | 1995 | 1995 |
| HN3684 | What's The Matter | Nada Pedley | 1995 | 1998 |
| HN3685 | Hometime | Nada Pedley | 1995 | 1997 |
| HN3686 | Nicole | Nada Pedley | 1995 | 1995 |
| HN3687 | Helen | Nada Pedley | 1995 | 1996 |
| HN3688 | Emily | Nada Pedley | 1995 | 1995 |
| HN3689 | Jacqueline | Nada Pedley | 1995 | 1995 |
| HN3690 | Angela | Nada Pedley | 1995 | 1997 |
| HN3691 | Rosemary | Nada Pedley | 1995 | 1997 |
| HN3692 | Old Country Roses | Nada Pedley | 1995 | 1999 |
| HN3693 | April | Nada Pedley | 1995 | 1997 |
| HN3694 | Caroline | Nada Pedley | 1995 | 1998 |
| HN3695 | Storytime | Nada Pedley | 1995 | 1998 |
| HN3696 | Faithful Friend | Nada Pedley | 1995 | 1997 |
| HN3697 | Home at Last | Nada Pedley | 1995 | 1999 |
| HN3698 | Rosemary | Nada Pedley | 1995 | 1997 |
| HN3699 | Grace | Nada Pedley | 1996 | 2001 |

== HN3700 to 3799 ==
| # | Title | Designer(s) | From | To |
|---|---|---|---|---|
| HN3700 | Forget-Me-Nots | Valerie Annand | 1995 | 1998 |
| HN3701 | Camellias | Valerie Annand | 1995 | 1998 |
| HN3702 | Le Bal | Valerie Annand | 1995 | 1995 |
| HN3703 | Belle | Valerie Annand | 1996 | 1996 |
| HN3704 | First Violin | Valerie Annand | 1995 | 1995 |
| HN3705 | Second Violin | Valerie Annand | 1995 | 1995 |
| HN3706 | Viola | Valerie Annand | 1995 | 1995 |
| HN3707 | Cello | Valerie Annand | 1995 | 1995 |
| HN3708 | Katherine | Valerie Annand | 1996 | 1996 |
| HN3709 | Rose | Valerie Annand | 1996 | 2000 |
| HN3710 | Primrose | Valerie Annand | 1996 | 1998 |
| HN3711 | Jane | Valerie Annand | 1997 | 1997 |
| HN3712 | New Baby | Valerie Annand | 1997 | 2002 |
| HN3713 | New Baby | Valerie Annand | 1997 | 2002 |
| HN3714 | Emma – 2nd | Valerie Annand | 1997 | 2003 |
| HN3715 | Sophie | Valerie Annand | 1997 | 2001 |
| HN3716 | Isabel | Valerie Annand | 1997 | 2001 |
| HN3717 | Olivia | Valerie Annand | 1997 | 2002 |
| HN3718 | Charge of the Light Brigade | Alan Maslankowski | 1995 | Present |
| HN3719 | Long John Silver | Alan Maslankowski | 1993 | 1996 |
| HN3720 | Robin Hood | Alan Maslankowski | 1993 | 1996 |
| HN3721 | Pied Piper | Alan Maslankowski | 1993 | 1996 |
| HN3722 | Wizard | Alan Maslankowski | 1994 | 1996 |
| HN3723 | Au Revoir | Alan Maslankowski | 1995 | 1998 |
| HN3724 | Summer Breeze | Alan Maslankowski | 1995 | 1998 |
| HN3725 | Spring Morning | Alan Maslankowski | 1995 | 1998 |
| HN3726 | Dinnertime | Alan Maslankowski | 1995 | 1998 |
| HN3727 | Christmas Carols | Alan Maslankowski | 1995 | 1999 |
| HN3728 | Free Spirit | Alan Maslankowski | 1995 | 1998 |
| HN3729 | Au Revoir | Alan Maslankowski | 1996 | 1999 |
| HN3730 | Innocence | Alan Maslankowski | 1996 | 2000 |
| HN3731 | Ballet Class | Alan Maslankowski | 1996 | 2003 |
| HN3732 | Wizard | Alan Maslankowski | 1995 | 1996 |
| HN3733 | Christmas Angel | Alan Maslankowski | 1996 | 1998 |
| HN3734 | Top ‘O The Hill | Leslie Harradine | 1995 | 1996 |
| HN3735 | Victoria | Margaret Davies | 1995 | 1996 |
| HN3735a | Top ‘O The Hill | Leslie Harradine | 1997 | 1997 |
| HN3736 | Autumn Breezes | Leslie Harradine | 1997 | 1998 |
| HN3737 | Old Balloon Seller | Leslie Harradine | 1999 | 1999 |
| HN3740 | Lynne | Margaret Davies | 1995 | 1995 |
| HN3741 | Elaine | Margaret Davies | 1995 | 1995 |
| HN3742 | Gillian | Margaret Davies | 1995 | 1997 |
| HN3743 | Kirsty | Margaret Davies | 1995 | 1995 |
| HN3744 | Victoria | Margaret Davies | 1995 | 1998 |
| HN3746 | Memory Lane | Margaret Davies | 1996 | 1996 |
| HN3747 | Tranquillty | Margaret Davies | 1996 | 1996 |
| HN3748 | Fiona | Margaret Davies | 1996 | 2002 |
| HN3749 | Karen | Margaret Davies | 1997 | 1997 |
| HN3750 | Guilliver | D Briggs | 1995 | 1996 |
| HN3751 | Cyrano de Bergerac | D Briggs | 1995 | 1996 |
| HN3752 | Fagin | A Dobson | 1995 | 1996 |
| HN3754 | For You | Tim Potts | 1996 | 2003 |
| HN3755 | Strolling | Tim Potts | 1996 | 1999 |
| HN3756 | Pamela | Tim Potts | 1996 | 1996 |
| HN3757 | Jean | Tim Potts | 1996 | 1997 |
| HN3758 | Bride of the Year | Tim Potts | 1996 | 1996 |
| HN3759 | Stephanie | Tim Potts | 1996 | 1996 |
| HN3760 | Laura | Nada Pedley | 1996 | 1999 |
| HN3761 | Sleepyhead | Nada Pedley | 1996 | 1998 |
| HN3762 | Time For Bed | Nada Pedley | 1996 | 1998 |
| HN3763 | Helen | Nada Pedley | 1996 | 1996 |
| HN3764 | Welcome | Nada Pedley | 1996 | 1996 |
| HN3765 | Kate | Nada Pedley | 1996 | 1996 |
| HN3766 | Anita | Nada Pedley | 1996 | 1996 |
| HN3767 | Christine | Nada Pedley | 1996 | 1998 |
| HN3768 | Off To School | Nada Pedley | 1996 | 1998 |
| HN3769 | Winter's Day | Nada Pedley | 1996 | 1997 |
| HN3770 | Sir Francis Drake | D Briggs | 1996 | 1996 |
| HN3780 | The Bowls Player | J Jones | 1996 | 1996 |
| HN3785 | Bill Sikes | A Dobson | 1996 | 1996 |
| HN3786 | Oliver Twist and the Artful Dodger | A Dobson | 1996 | 1996 |
| HN3790 | Sophie | Alan Maslankowski | 1996 | 1997 |
| HN3791 | Sophie | Alan Maslankowski | 1996 | 1997 |
| HN3792 | Sophie | Alan Maslankowski | 1996 | 1997 |
| HN3793 | Sophie | Alan Maslankowski | 1996 | 1997 |
| HN3794 | Harriet | Alan Maslankowski | 1996 | 1997 |
| HN3795 | Harriet | Alan Maslankowski | 1996 | 1997 |
| HN3796 | Harriet | Alan Maslankowski | 1996 | 1997 |
| HN3797 | Harriet | Alan Maslankowski | 1996 | 1997 |
| HN3798 | Eliza | Alan Maslankowski | 1996 | 1997 |
| HN3799 | Eliza | Alan Maslankowski | 1996 | 1997 |

== HN3800 to 3899 ==
| # | Title | Designer(s) | From | To |
|---|---|---|---|---|
| HN3800 | Eliza | Alan Maslankowski | 1996 | 1997 |
| HN3801 | Eliza | Alan Maslankowski | 1996 | 1997 |
| HN3802 | Daisy | Alan Maslankowski | 1996 | 1997 |
| HN3803 | Daisy | Alan Maslankowski | 1996 | 1997 |
| HN3804 | Daisy | Alan Maslankowski | 1996 | 1997 |
| HN3805 | Daisy | Alan Maslankowski | 1996 | 1997 |
| HN3806 | Emily | Alan Maslankowski | 1996 | 1997 |
| HN3807 | Emily | Alan Maslankowski | 1996 | 1997 |
| HN3808 | Emily | Alan Maslankowski | 1996 | 1997 |
| HN3809 | Emily | Alan Maslankowski | 1996 | 1997 |
| HN3810 | Charlotte | Alan Maslankowski | 1996 | 1997 |
| HN3811 | Charlotte | Alan Maslankowski | 1996 | 1997 |
| HN3812 | Charlotte | Alan Maslankowski | 1996 | 1997 |
| HN3813 | Charlotte | Alan Maslankowski | 1996 | 1997 |
| HN3814 | Cricketer | Alan Maslankowski | 1996 | 1996 |
| HN3815 | Fond Farewell | Alan Maslankowski | 1997 | 1999 |
| HN3816 | Ellen | Alan Maslankowski | 1997 | 1997 |
| HN3819 | Ellen | Alan Maslankowski | 1997 | 1997 |
| HN3820 | Lillie Langtry | D V Tootle | 1996 | 1996 |
| HN3821 | Alfred The Great | D V Tootle | 1996 | 1997 |
| HN3822 | James I (1603–1625) | D V Tootle | 1996 | 1996 |
| HN3824 | Charles I (1625–1649) | D V Tootle | 1997 | 1997 |
| HN3825 | Charles II | D V Tootle | 1996 | 1996 |
| HN3826 | Ellen Terry | D V Tootle | 1996 | 1996 |
| HN3827 | Performance | D V Tootle | 1997 | 2001 |
| HN3828 | Ballerina | D V Tootle | 1997 | 2001 |
| HN3829 | Happy Birthday | D V Tootle | 1997 | 2002 |
| HN3830 | Belle | Pauline Parsons | 1996 | 1996 |
| HN3831 | Ariel | Pauline Parsons | 1996 | 1996 |
| HN3832 | Jasmine | Pauline Parsons | 1996 | 1996 |
| HN3833 | Aurora | Pauline Parsons | 1996 | 1996 |
| HN3834 | Mary Tudor | Pauline Parsons | 1997 | 1997 |
| HN3835 | Scheherazade | Pauline Parsons | 1996 | 1996 |
| HN3836 | Queen Elizabeth II and The Duke of Edinburgh | Pauline Parsons | 1997 | 1997 |
| HN3838 | Margaret Tudor | Pauline Parsons | 1997 | 1997 |
| HN3839 | Cruella DeVil | Pauline Parsons | 1997 | 1997 |
| HN3840 | Maleficent | P Parsons | 1997 | 1997 |
| HN3841 | Rapunzel | Pauline Parsons | 1998 | 1998 |
| HN3842 | Jane Eyre | Pauline Parsons | 1998 | 1998 |
| HN3843 | Emma | Pauline Parsons | 1997 | 1997 |
| HN3844 | Nefertiti | Pauline Parsons | 1998 | 1998 |
| HN3845 | Elizabeth Bennet | Pauline Parsons | 1998 | 1998 |
| HN3846 | Tess Of The D'Urbervilles | Pauline Parsons | 1998 | 1998 |
| HN3847 | Queen | Pauline Parsons | 1998 | 1998 |
| HN3848 | Witch | Pauline Parsons | 1998 | 1998 |
| HN3849 | Moll Flanders | Pauline Parsons | 1999 | 1999 |
| HN3850 | Jessica | Nada Pedley | 1997 | 1997 |
| HN3851 | Sally | Tim Potts | 1996 | 1998 |
| HN3852 | Sarah | Tim Potts | 1996 | 1999 |
| HN3853 | Wedding Morn | Tim Potts | 1996 | 1999 |
| HN3854 | Amy | Tim Potts | 1996 | 1999 |
| HN3855 | Lambing Time | Tim Potts | 1996 | 1998 |
| HN3856 | Country Girl | Tim Potts | 1996 | 1998 |
| HN3857 | Sarah | Tim Potts | 1996 | 1996 |
| HN3858 | Lucy | Tim Potts | 1997 | 1999 |
| HN3859 | Sweet Bouquet | Tim Potts | 1997 | 1997 |
| HN3860 | Morning Walk | Tim Potts | 1997 | 1998 |
| HN3861 | Center Stage | Tim Potts | 1996 | 1996 |
| HN3862 | Jean | Tim Potts | 1997 | 1997 |
| HN3863 | For You | Tim Potts | 1997 | 1999 |
| HN3864 | Kimberley | Tim Potts | 1997 | 1997 |
| HN3865 | Anna of the Five Towns | Tim Potts | 1997 | 1998 |
| HN3866 | Bon Voyage | Tim Potts | 1998 | 2001 |
| HN3867 | Countess of Chell | Tim Potts | 1998 | 1998 |
| HN3868 | Danielle | Tim Potts | 1998 | 1998 |
| HN3869 | Courtney | Nada Pedley | 1999 | 1999 |
| HN3870 | Hannah | Nada Pedley | 1995 | 1996 |
| HN3871 | Susan | Nada Pedley | 1997 | 1997 |
| HN3872 | Lauren | Nada Pedley | 1997 | 1997 |
| HN3875 | Joy | Nada Pedley | 1997 | 1997 |
| HN3876 | Kitty | Nada Pedley | 1997 | 2000 |
| HN3877 | On The Beach | Nada Pedley | 1997 | 1999 |
| HN3878 | Julie | Nada Pedley | 1997 | 2001 |
| HN3879 | Linda | Nada Pedley | 1997 | 1997 |
| HN3880 | Kathleen | Nada Pedley | 1997 | 1997 |
| HN3882 | Kate | Nada Pedley | 1997 | 1997 |
| HN3883 | Chloe | Nada Pedley | 1997 | 1998 |
| HN3885 | Melissa | Nada Pedley | 1997 | 1999 |
| HN3886 | Helen | Nada Pedley | 1997 | 1999 |
| HN3887 | Megan | Nada Pedley | 1997 | 2000 |
| HN3888 | Louise | Nada Pedley | 1997 | 2000 |
| HN3889 | Flowers For You | Nada Pedley | 1997 | 1999 |
| HN3890 | Geoffrey Boycott | Robert Tabbenor | 1996 | 1996 |
| HN3891 | Sir Henry Doulton | Robert Tabbenor | 1997 | 1997 |

== HN3900 to 3999 ==
| # | Title | Designer(s) | From | To |
|---|---|---|---|---|
| HN3900 | Elaine | Margaret Davies | 1997 | 1997 |
| HN3901 | Ninette | Margaret Davies | 1997 | 1997 |
| HN3902 | Lily | Margaret Davies | 1998 | 1998 |
| HN3903 | Mary | Margaret Davies | 1998 | 1998 |
| HN3904 | Valerie | Margaret Davies | 1998 | 1998 |
| HN3905 | Christine | Margaret Davies | 1998 | 1998 |
| HN3906 | Eleanor | Margaret Davies | 1998 | 1998 |
| HN3907 | Patricia | Margaret Davies | 1998 | 1998 |
| HN3908 | Buttercup | Margaret Davies | 1998 | 1998 |
| HN3909 | Victoria | Margaret Davies | 1998 | 1998 |
| HN3911 | First Prize | Nada Pedley | 1997 | 1999 |
| HN3912 | Kelly | Nada Pedley | 1997 | 1998 |
| HN3913 | First Bloom | Nada Pedley | 1997 | 1997 |
| HN3914 | Chloe | Nada Pedley | 1997 | 2002 |
| HN3915 | Colleen | Nada Pedley | 1997 | 2002 |
| HN3916 | Spring Posy | Nada Pedley | 1997 | 1997 |
| HN3917 | Summer Blooms | Nada Pedley | 1997 | 1997 |
| HN3918 | Autumn Flowers | Nada Pedley | 1997 | 1997 |
| HN3919 | Winter Bouquet | Nada Pedley | 1997 | 1997 |
| HN3920 | Jack Point | Nada Pedley | 1996 | 1996 |
| HN3921 | Princess Badoura | H Tittensor | 1996 | 1999 |
| HN3922 | A Jester (Parian) | Charles J Noke | 1997 | 1997 |
| HN3924 | Lady Jester | William K Harper | 1998 | 1998 |
| HN3925 | Jack Point | Charles J Noke | 1998 | 1998 |
| HN3926 | Moor | Charles J Noke | 1999 | 1999 |
| HN3930 | Constance | Alan Maslankowski | 1997 | 1997 |
| HN3933 | Constance | Alan Maslankowski | 1997 | 1997 |
| HN3934 | Across The Miles | Alan Maslankowski | 1997 | 1999 |
| HN3935 | Best Friends | Alan Maslankowski | 1997 | 1999 |
| HN3936 | Goose Girl | Alan Maslankowski | 1997 | 1998 |
| HN3938 | Mother and Child | Alan Maslankowski | 1997 | Present |
| HN3940 | Angel | Alan Maslankowski | 1997 | 1999 |
| HN3942 | Graduation (Female) | Alan Maslankowski | 1997 | 2002 |
| HN3944 | HM Queen Elizabeth II – The Queen Mother | Alan Maslankowski | 1997 | 1997 |
| HN3945 | Millie | Alan Maslankowski | 1997 | 1997 |
| HN3946 | Millie | Alan Maslankowski | 1997 | 1997 |
| HN3947 | Henry V at Agincourt | Alan Maslankowski | 1997 | Present |
| HN3948 | Loving Thoughts | Alan Maslankowski | 1997 | 1999 |
| HN3949 | Forever Yours | Alan Maslankowski | 1998 | 2001 |
| HN3950 | Star Performer | Alan Maslankowski | 1997 | 2003 |
| HN3951 | Stage Struck | Alan Maslankowski | 1997 | 2003 |
| HN3952 | Messiah | Alan Maslankowski | 1997 | 1999 |
| HN3953 | Christmas Lantern | Alan Maslankowski | 1997 | 1998 |
| HN3954 | Moonlight Stroll | Alan Maslankowski | 1997 | 1999 |
| HN3955 | Summer Scent | Alan Maslankowski | 1997 | 1999 |
| HN3956 | Spring Serenade | Alan Maslankowski | 1997 | 1999 |
| HN3957 | Eleanor of Aquitaine | Alan Maslankowski | 1997 | 1997 |
| HN3958 | Country Girl | Alan Maslankowski | 1998 | 1999 |
| HN3959 | Graduate | Alan Maslankowski | 1998 | 2001 |
| HN3970 | Flower of Love | John Bromley | 1996 | 1997 |
| HN3971 | Best Wishes | John Bromley | 1998 | 2004 |
| HN3972 | Sweet Lilac | John Bromley | 2000 | 2000 |
| HN3975 | Lauren | D Hughes | 1999 | 1999 |
| HN3976 | Rachel | D Hughes | 2000 | 2000 |
| HN3977 | Melissa | D Hughes | 2001 | 2001 |
| HN3978 | Sarah | Adrian Hughes | 2002 | 2002 |
| HN3991 | Cinderella | John Bromley | 1997 | 2000 |
| HN3991p | Cinderella | John Bromley | 1997 | 1997 |
| HN3992 | Ellen | John Bromley | 1997 | 1997 |
| HN3993 | Carmen | M Halson | 1997 | 1997 |
| HN3994 | Red Red Rose | R Hughes | 1997 | 1997 |
| HN3995 | Sophie | John Bromley | 1998 | 1998 |
| HN3996 | Miss Violet | M Evans | 1998 | 1998 |
| HN3997 | Miss Maisie | M Evans | 1998 | 1998 |
| HN3998 | Miss Tilly | M Evans | 1998 | 1998 |
| HN3999 | Shall I Compare Thee | John Bromley | 1998 | 1998 |

== HN4000 to 4099 ==
| # | Title | Designer(s) | From | To |
|---|---|---|---|---|
| HN4000 | Sleeping Beauty | S Curzon | 1998 | 1998 |
| HN4001 | My True Love | John Bromley | 1999 | 1999 |
| HN4003 | Alice | John Bromley | 1999 | 1999 |
| HN4015 | Eleanor | John Bromley | 2001 | 2001 |
| HN4016 | A Love So Tender | M Halson | 2001 | 2001 |
| HN4017 | Ellie | John Bromley | 2003 | 2003 |
| HN4021 | Amen | D V Tootle | 1997 | Current |
| HN4022 | William III (1650–1702) | D V Tootle | 1998 | 1998 |
| HN4023 | Sarah Bernhardt | D V Tootle | 1998 | 1998 |
| HN4024 | Prima Ballerina | D V Tootle | 1998 | 2000 |
| HN4025 | Dance | D V Tootle | 1998 | 2002 |
| HN4026 | Best Friends | D V Tootle | 1998 | 1998 |
| HN4027 | The Ballet Dancer | D V Tootle | 1998 | 2000 |
| HN4028 | Ballet Lesson | D V Tootle | 1998 | 2001 |
| HN4030 | Leap-Frog | D V Tootle | 1999 | 2001 |
| HN4031 | Carol Singer (Boy) | D V Tootle | 1999 | 1999 |
| HN4032 | Carol Singer (Girl) | D V Tootle | 1999 | 1999 |
| HN4033 | Promise | D V Tootle | 1999 | 1999 |
| HN4034 | Mary and Jesus | D V Tootle | 1999 | 1999 |
| HN4035 | Joseph | D V Tootle | 1999 | 1999 |
| HN4036 | Balthaazar | D V Tootle | 1999 | 1999 |
| HN4037 | Mechoir | D V Tootle | 1999 | 1999 |
| HN4038 | Caspar | D V Tootle | 1999 | 1999 |
| HN4039 | Boy Shepherd | D V Tootle | 1999 | 1999 |
| HN4040 | Kathryn | Valerie Annand | 1997 | 2003 |
| HN4041 | Rebecca | Valerie Annand | 1998 | 1998 |
| HN4042 | Janet | Valerie Annand | 1998 | 1998 |
| HN4043 | Samantha | Valerie Annand | 1998 | 1998 |
| HN4044 | Abigail | Valerie Annand | 1998 | 2001 |
| HN4045 | Blossomtime | Valerie Annand | 1998 | 2001 |
| HN4046 | Ellie | Valerie Annand | 1998 | 2001 |
| HN4047 | Georgina | Valerie Annand | 1998 | 2001 |
| HN4048 | Natalie | Valerie Annand | 1999 | 2001 |
| HN4049 | Jessica | Valerie Annand | 1999 | 2001 |
| HN4050 | Hannah | Valerie Annand | 1998 | 1998 |
| HN4051 | Hannah | Valerie Annand | 1998 | 1998 |
| HN4052 | Hannah | Valerie Annand | 1999 | 2000 |
| HN4053 | Joy | Valerie Annand | 1999 | 2000 |
| HN4054 | Joy | Valerie Annand | 1999 | 2000 |
| HN4055 | Kneeling Shepherd | D V Tootle | 1999 | 2000 |
| HN4056 | Standing Shepherd | D V Tootle | 1999 | 1999 |
| HN4057 | Romeo and Juliet | D V Tootle | 1999 | 1999 |
| HN4058 | Harlequin | D V Tootle | 1999 | 1999 |
| HN4059 | Columbine | D V Tootle | 1999 | 1999 |
| HN4060 | Christmas Angel | Alan Maslankowski | 1997 | 1998 |
| HN4061 | Christmas Carols | Alan Maslankowski | 1997 | 1998 |
| HN4062 | Christmas Day | Alan Maslankowski | 1997 | 1998 |
| HN4063 | Christmas Parcels | Alan Maslankowski | 1997 | 1998 |
| HN4064 | Kiss (Boy) | Alan Maslankowski | 1998 | 2003 |
| HN4065 | Kiss (Girl) | Alan Maslankowski | 1998 | 2003 |
| HN4066 | Philippa of Hainault | Alan Maslankowski | 1998 | 1998 |
| HN4067 | Christmas Garland | Alan Maslankowski | 1998 | 2000 |
| HN4068 | Happy Anniversary | Alan Maslankowski | 1998 | 2004 |
| HN4069 | Wizard | Alan Maslankowski | 1998 | 1998 |
| HN4070 | Good Luck | Alan Maslankowski | 1999 | 2004 |
| HN4071 | Heathcliff and Cathy | Alan Maslankowski | 1999 | 1999 |
| HN4073 | Margaret of Anjou (1430–1482) | Alan Maslankowski | 1998 | 1998 |
| HN4074 | Sophia Dorothea (1666–1726) | Alan Maslankowski | 1998 | 1998 |
| HN4076 | Missing You | Alan Maslankowski | 1999 | 2001 |
| HN4077 | Kindred Spirits | Alan Maslankowski | 2000 | 2000 |
| HN4078 | Aurora – Goddess of the Dawn | Alan Maslankowski | 1999 | 1999 |
| HN4079 | Hebe – Handmaiden to the Gods | Alan Maslankowski | 1999 | 1999 |
| HN4080 | Ceres, Goddess of Plenty | Alan Maslankowski | 1999 | 1999 |
| HN4081 | Artemis – Goddess of the Hunt | Alan Maslankowski | 1999 | 1999 |
| HN4082 | Erato – The Parnassian Muse | Alan Maslankowski | 1999 | 1999 |
| HN4083 | Wisdom | Alan Maslankowski | 1999 | 2001 |
| HN4084 | Noel | Alan Maslankowski | 1999 | 1999 |
| HN4085 | Remembering You | Alan Maslankowski | 2000 | 2002 |
| HN4086 | H M Queen Elizabeth, The Queen Mother | Alan Maslankowski | 2000 | 2000 |
| HN4089 | Storytime | Alan Maslankowski | 2000 | 2005 |
| HN4090 | Annabelle | Nada Pedley | 1998 | 1998 |
| HN4091 | Molly | Nada Pedley | 1997 | 2003 |
| HN4092 | Charlotte | Nada Pedley | 1998 | 2002 |
| HN4093 | Emily | Nada Pedley | 1998 | 2004 |
| HN4094 | Rosie | Nada Pedley | 1998 | 2004 |
| HN4095 | Anna | Nada Pedley | 1998 | 2000 |
| HN4096 | Harmony | Nada Pedley | 1998 | 1998 |
| HN4097 | Hope | Nada Pedley | 1998 | 1999 |
| HN4098 | Suzanne | Nada Pedley | 1998 | 2001 |
| HN4099 | Ruth | Nada Pedley | 1998 | 2001 |

== HN4100 to 4199 ==
| # | Title | Designer(s) | From | To |
|---|---|---|---|---|
| HN4100 | Special Occasion | Nada Pedley | 1998 | 2002 |
| HN4101 | Kirsten | Nada Pedley | 1998 | 2000 |
| HN4102 | Pride and Joy | Nada Pedley | 1998 | 2004 |
| HN4103 | Sugar and Spice | Nada Pedley | 1998 | 2003 |
| HN4109 | Mackenzie | Nada Pedley | 1998 | 1998 |
| HN4110 | Jane | Nada Pedley | 1998 | 1998 |
| HN4111 | Alice | Nada Pedley | 1998 | 2001 |
| HN4112 | Nicole | Nada Pedley | 1999 | 1999 |
| HN4113 | Sweet Poetry | Nada Pedley | 1999 | 2002 |
| HN4114 | Mary | Nada Pedley | 1999 | 2002 |
| HN4115 | Brenda | Nada Pedley | 1999 | 2003 |
| HN4116 | Barbara | Nada Pedley | 1999 | 2003 |
| HN4117 | Melody | Nada Pedley | 1999 | 1999 |
| HN4118 | Special Gift | Nada Pedley | 1999 | 1999 |
| HN4123 | Katie | Nada Pedley | 1998 | 2002 |
| HN4124 | Julia | Nada Pedley | 1999 | 1999 |
| HN4125 | Amber | Nada Pedley | 1999 | 2003 |
| HN4126 | Brianna | Nada Pedley | 1999 | 2003 |
| HN4127 | Jasmine | Nada Pedley | 1999 | 2003 |
| HN4128 | Kaitlyn | Nada Pedley | 1999 | 2003 |
| HN4129 | Special Gift | Nada Pedley | 1999 | 2000 |
| HN4130 | Elaine | Margaret Davies | 1998 | 1998 |
| HN4131 | Elyse | Margaret Davies | 1998 | 1998 |
| HN4132 | Alyssa | Margaret Davies | 1999 | 2003 |
| HN4140 | Darling | C Vyse | 1998 | 1998 |
| HN4141 | Mask | Leslie Harradine | 1999 | 1999 |
| HN4151 | Faith | Nada Pedley | 1999 | 2000 |
| HN4152 | Madeline | Nada Pedley | 1999 | 2003 |
| HN4153 | Marianne | Nada Pedley | 1999 | 2002 |
| HN4154 | Natasha | Nada Pedley | 1999 | 2001 |
| HN4155 | Lynne | Nada Pedley | 1999 | 2002 |
| HN4156 | Beth | Nada Pedley | 1999 | 2002 |
| HN4157 | Kelly | Nada Pedley | 1999 | 2005 |
| HN4158 | Michelle | Nada Pedley | 1999 | 2002 |
| HN4160 | Sally | Tim Potts | 1998 | 1998 |
| HN4161 | Open Road | Tim Potts | 1999 | 2001 |
| HN4162 | Clara Hamps | Tim Potts | 1999 | 2001 |
| HN4163 | Ecstasy | Tim Potts | 1999 | 1999 |
| HN4164 | Destiny | Tim Potts | 1999 | 1999 |
| HN4165 | Optimism | Tim Potts | 1999 | 1999 |
| HN4166 | Wisdom | Tim Potts | 1999 | 1999 |
| HN4167 | Sophia Baines | Tim Potts | 2000 | 2001 |
| HN4168 | Gladys | Leslie Harradine | 2000 | 2000 |
| HN4169 | Vera | Leslie Harradine | 2000 | 2000 |
| HN4174 | Land Of Nod | H Tittensor | 2000 | 2000 |
| HN4175 | Santa Claus | Robert Tabbenor | 2000 | 2003 |
| HN4179 | Princess Badoura | Robert Tabbenor | 2001 | 2001 |
| HN4184 | A New Life | | 2003 | Present |
| HN4188 | Storytime | Alan Maslankowski | 2000 | 2003 |
| HN4190 | Ankhesenamun | Pauline Parsons | 1998 | 1998 |
| HN4191 | Hatshepsut | Pauline Parsons | 1999 | 1999 |
| HN4192 | Tender Moment | Pauline Parsons | 1999 | 2003 |
| HN4193 | Sweet Dreams | Pauline Parsons | 1999 | 2002 |
| HN4194 | Summer Blooms | Pauline Parsons | 1999 | 2003 |
| HN4195 | Summer Fragrance | Pauline Parsons | 1999 | 2000 |
| HN4196 | Daybreak | Pauline Parsons | 1999 | 2003 |
| HN4197 | Secret Thoughts | Pauline Parsons | 1999 | 2003 |
| HN4198 | Sunset | Pauline Parsons | 2000 | 2003 |
| HN4199 | Sunrise | Pauline Parsons | 2000 | 2003 |

== HN4200 to 4299 ==
| # | Title | Designer(s) | From | To |
|---|---|---|---|---|
| HN4200 | Scarlett O'Hara | Valerie Annand | 1999 | 2000 |
| HN4201a | Chloe | John Bromley | 2000 | 2000 |
| HN4201b | Millennium Celebration | Valerie Annand | 1999 | 2001 |
| HN4202 | Joanne | Valerie Annand | 2000 | 2002 |
| HN4203 | Rebecca | Valerie Annand | 2000 | 2002 |
| HN4204 | Madison | Valerie Annand | 2000 | 2003 |
| HN4205 | Alexis | Valerie Annand | 2000 | 2003 |
| HN4206 | Brittany | Valerie Annand | 2000 | 2003 |
| HN4207 | Allison | Valerie Annand | 2000 | 2003 |
| HN4208 | Zoe | Valerie Annand | 2000 | 2003 |
| HN4209 | Melinda | Valerie Annand | 2000 | 2002 |
| HN4210 | Jayne | Nada Pedley | 1999 | 2001 |
| HN4211 | Lydia | Nada Pedley | 1999 | 2001 |
| HN4212 | Millie | Nada Pedley | 1999 | 1999 |
| HN4213 | With All My Love | Nada Pedley | 2000 | 2000 |
| HN4214 | Christmas Day 1999 | Nada Pedley | 1999 | 1999 |
| HN4215 | Happy Birthday 2000 | Nada Pedley | 2000 | 2000 |
| HN4216 | Wedding Celebration | Nada Pedley | 2000 | 2002 |
| HN4220 | Camilla | Nada Pedley | 2000 | 2002 |
| HN4221 | Susannah | Nada Pedley | 2000 | 2003 |
| HN4222 | Fair Maid | Nada Pedley | 2000 | 2002 |
| HN4223 | Josephine | Nada Pedley | 2000 | 2003 |
| HN4225 | Summer Duet | Nada Pedley | 1999 | 1999 |
| HN4226 | After The Rain | Nada Pedley | 1999 | 1999 |
| HN4227 | Off To The Pond | Nada Pedley | 1999 | 1999 |
| HN4228 | Helping Mother | Nada Pedley | 1999 | 1999 |
| HN4229 | Wedding Celebration | Nada Pedley | 2000 | 2002 |
| HN4230 | Susan | John Bromley | 2000 | 2000 |
| HN4231 | Ellen | John Bromley | 2000 | 2002 |
| HN4232 | Specially For You | John Bromley | 2000 | 2004 |
| HN4233 | Kate | John Bromley | 2000 | 2000 |
| HN4234 | Special Celebration | John Bromley | 2001 | 2004 |
| HN4235 | Belle | John Bromley | 2001 | 2004 |
| HN4236 | Just For You | John Bromley | 2002 | 2004 |
| HN4237 | Georgina | John Bromley | 2002 | 2002 |
| HN4238 | Francesca | D Hughes | 2001 | 2001 |
| HN4240 | Flower of Scotland | Nada Pedley | 2000 | 2003 |
| HN4241 | With All My Love | Nada Pedley | 2000 | 2001 |
| HN4242 | Christmas Day 2000 | Nada Pedley | 2000 | 2000 |
| HN4243 | Charity | Nada Pedley | 2000 | 2001 |
| HN4244 | Bather | Leslie Harradine | 2000 | 2000 |
| HN4245 | Sunshine Girl | Leslie Harradine | 2000 | 2000 |
| HN4246 | Swimmer | Leslie Harradine | 2000 | 2000 |
| HN4247 | Lido Lady | Leslie Harradine | 2000 | 2000 |
| HN4248 | Jennifer | Nada Pedley | 2000 | 2004 |
| HN4249 | Dairy Maid | Nada Pedley | 2000 | 2002 |
| HN4250 | Greetings | Alan Maslankowski | 2000 | 2000 |
| HN4251 | Thank You Mother | Alan Maslankowski | 2000 | 2003 |
| HN4252 | Sorcerer | Alan Maslankowski | 2000 | 2002 |
| HN4253 | Sorceress | Alan Maslankowski | 2000 | 2002 |
| HN4254 | Many Happy Returns | Alan Maslankowski | 2000 | 2004 |
| HN4255 | Happy Christmas | Alan Maslankowski | 2000 | 2003 |
| HN4256 | Carol Singer with Lantern | D V Tootle | 2000 | 2000 |
| HN4257 | Special Friends | Alan Maslankowski | 2001 | 2001 |
| HN4258 | Embrace | Alan Maslankowski | 2001 | 2001 |
| HN4260 | Henrietta-Maria (Wife of Charles I) | Pauline Parsons | 2000 | 2000 |
| HN4261 | Tender Greetings | Pauline Parsons | 2000 | 2002 |
| HN4262 | In Loving Arms | Pauline Parsons | 2000 | 2002 |
| HN4263 | Edward VI | Pauline Parsons | 2000 | 2000 |
| HN4264 | Cleopatra | Pauline Parsons | 2001 | 2001 |
| HN4265 | Cherished Memories | Pauline Parsons | 2001 | 2002 |
| HN4266 | Anne of Denmark | Pauline Parsons | 2001 | 2001 |
| HN4267 | Catherine of Braganza (Wife of Charles II) | Pauline Parsons | 2001 | 2001 |
| HN4270 | Spring | M King | 2000 | 2000 |
| HN4271 | Summer Duet | M King | 2000 | 2000 |
| HN4272 | Autumn | M King | 2000 | 2000 |
| HN4273 | Winter | M King | 2000 | 2000 |
| HN4280 | Love Everlasting | Adrian Hughes | 2000 | Present |
| HN4281 | Debut | Adrian Hughes | 2000 | 2000 |
| HN4282 | Encore | Adrian Hughes | 2000 | 2000 |
| HN4283 | Trumpet Player | Adrian Hughes | 2000 | 2000 |
| HN4284 | Saxophone Player | Adrian Hughes | 2000 | 2000 |
| HN4285 | Age of Swing | Adrian Hughes | 2000 | 2000 |
| HN4286 | Doctor | Adrian Hughes | 2001 | 2002 |
| HN4287 | Nurse | Adrian Hughes | 2001 | Present |
| HN4289 | Lawyer | Adrian Hughes | 2001 | 2003 |
| HN4290 | Carol Singer (Brother) | D V Tootle | 2000 | 2000 |
| HN4291 | Carol Singer (Sister) | D V Tootle | 2000 | 2000 |

== HN4300 to 4399 ==
| # | Title | Designer(s) | From | To |
|---|---|---|---|---|
| HN4300 | Bells Across the Valley | Nada Pedley | 1999 | 2004 |
| HN4301 | Lorraine | Nada Pedley | 2000 | 2004 |
| HN4302 | Sweet Music | Nada Pedley | 2001 | 2004 |
| HN4303 | Charlotte | Nada Pedley | 2000 | 2001 |
| HN4304 | Catherine | Nada Pedley | 2001 | 2004 |
| HN4305 | Milk Maid | Nada Pedley | 2001 | 2002 |
| HN4306 | Congratulations To You | Nada Pedley | 2000 | 2004 |
| HN4307 | Christine | Nada Pedley | 2001 | 2001 |
| HN4308 | Happy Birthday 2001 | Nada Pedley | 2001 | 2001 |
| HN4309 | Jacqueline | Nada Pedley | 2001 | 2001 |
| HN4310 | Janet | Nada Pedley | 2001 | 2002 |
| HN4311 | Margaret | Nada Pedley | 2001 | 2004 |
| HN4312 | Pretty as a Picture | Nada Pedley | 2001 | 2004 |
| HN4313 | For Your Special Day | Nada Pedley | 2001 | 2003 |
| HN4314 | New Dawn | Nada Pedley | 2001 | 2002 |
| HN4315 | Christmas Day 2001 | Nada Pedley | 2001 | 2001 |
| HN4316 | Maid of the Meadow | Nada Pedley | 2001 | 2002 |
| HN4317 | Gentle Breeze | Nada Pedley | 2001 | 2002 |
| HN4318 | Loving Thoughts | Nada Pedley | 2001 | 2004 |
| HN4319 | Sweetheart | Nada Pedley | 2001 | 2004 |
| HN4320 | Claudia | Valerie Annand | 2000 | 2002 |
| HN4321 | Millennium Celebration | Valerie Annand | 2000 | 2000 |
| HN4322 | Becky | Valerie Annand | 2001 | 2004 |
| HN4323 | Katie | Valerie Annand | 2001 | 2004 |
| HN4324 | Bride | Valerie Annand | 2002 | 2003 |
| HN4325 | Millennium Celebration | Valerie Annand | 2000 | 2000 |
| HN4326 | Bethany | Valerie Annand | 2001 | 2003 |
| HN4327 | Amelia | Valerie Annand | 2002 | 2003 |
| HN4328 | Applause | Valerie Annand | 2002 | 2002 |
| HN4329 | Finishing Touch | Valerie Annand | 2002 | 2004 |
| HN2330 | Meditation | Margaret Davies | 1971 | 1983 |
| HN4350 | Christmas Eve | Alan Maslankowski | 2000 | 2002 |
| HN4351 | Sweetheart | Alan Maslankowski | 2000 | 2003 |
| HN4352 | Sweetheart | Alan Maslankowski | 2000 | 2003 |
| HN4353 | Liberty | Alan Maslankowski | 2000 | 2000 |
| HN4354 | Felicity | Alan Maslankowski | 2000 | 2000 |
| HN4356 | Sister and Brother | Alan Maslankowski | 2001 | 2007 |
| HN4357 | Perfect Pose | Alan Maslankowski | 2001 | 2003 |
| HN4358 | First Lesson | Alan Maslankowski | 2001 | 2003 |
| HN4360 | Arnold Bennett | Tim Potts | 2001 | 2001 |
| HN4361 | Land Girl | Tim Potts | 2001 | 2001 |
| HN4362 | Moonlight Gaze | Tim Potts | 2002 | 2002 |
| HN4363 | Farewell Daddy | Tim Potts | 2002 | 2002 |
| HN4364 | Women's Land Army | Tim Potts | 2002 | 2002 |
| HN4366 | Batsman | Tim Potts | 2003 | 2003 |
| HN4370 | Skating | Alan Maslankowski | 2001 | 2001 |
| HN4371 | St. George | Alan Maslankowski | 2001 | 2001 |
| HN4372 | HM Queen Elizabeth II | Alan Maslankowski | 2001 | 2001 |
| HN4373 | Bridesmaid | Alan Maslankowski | 2001 | 2005 |
| HN4374 | Pageboy | Alan Maslankowski | 2001 | 2002 |
| HN4375 | Independence | Alan Maslankowski | 2002 | 2002 |
| HN4376 | Surprise | Alan Maslankowski | 2001 | 2002 |
| HN4377 | Keep In Touch | Alan Maslankowski | 2002 | 2002 |
| HN4378 | Prayers | Alan Maslankowski | 2002 | 2005 |
| HN4379 | Wedding Vows | Alan Maslankowski | 2002 | Present |
| HN4380 | From This Day Forward | N Lee | 2000 | 2000 |
| HN4390 | Julia | Nada Pedley | 2001 | 2002 |
| HN4391 | Anna | Nada Pedley | 2001 | 2004 |
| HN4392 | My Love | Nada Pedley | 2001 | 2004 |
| HN4393 | Happy Birthday 2002 | Nada Pedley | 2002 | 2002 |
| HN4395 | Caroline | Nada Pedley | 2001 | 2001 |
| HN4396 | Serenity | Nada Pedley | 2001 | 2003 |
| HN4397 | Thoughts For You | Nada Pedley | 2001 | 2001 |
| HN4398 | Sweet Delight | Nada Pedley | 2001 | 2004 |
| HN4399 | Bathing Beauty | Nada Pedley | 2001 | 2001 |

== HN4400 to 4499 ==
| # | Title | Designer(s) | From | To |
|---|---|---|---|---|
| HN4400 | Brighton Belle | Nada M. Pedley | 2001 | 2001 |
| HN4401 | Summer's Darling | Nada M. Pedley | 2001 | 2001 |
| HN4402 | Taking The Waters | Nada M. Pedley | 2001 | 2001 |
| HN4403 | Samantha | Nada M. Pedley | 2002 | 2004 |
| HN4404 | Gillian | Nada M. Pedley | 2002 | 2003 |
| HN4405 | Angela | Nada M. Pedley | 2002 | 2003 |
| HN4406 | Summer Stroll | Nada M. Pedley | 2002 | 2004 |
| HN4407 | Hannah | Nada M. Pedley | 2002 | 2004 |
| HN4408 | Scarlett | Nada M. Pedley | 2002 | 2004 |
| HN4409 | Perfect Gift | Nada M. Pedley | 2002 | 2004 |
| HN4410 | Policeman | Adrian Hughes | 2001 | 2003 |
| HN4411 | Fireman | Adrian Hughes | 2002 | 2003 |
| HN4412 | The Judge | Adrian Hughes | 2002 | |
| HN4413 | Sleepyhead | Adrian Hughes | 2002 | |
| HN4414 | Athos | Adrian Hughes | 2001 | 2001 |
| HN4415 | Aramis | Adrian Hughes | 2001 | 2001 |
| HN4416 | Porthos | Adrian Hughes | 2001 | 2001 |
| HN4417 | D'Artagnan | Adrian Hughes | 2001 | 2001 |
| HN4418 | Railway Sleeper | Tim Potts | 2001 | 2001 |
| HN4420 | Prince Albert Duke of York | Valerie Annand | 2002 | 2002 |
| HN4421 | Elizabeth Bowes-Lyon (Wedding Day) | Valerie Annand | 2002 | 2002 |
| HN4422 | Christmas Day 2002 | Valerie Annand | 2002 | 2002 |
| HN4423 | Jenny | Valerie Annand | 2002 | 2004 |
| HN4424 | Antique Dealer | Valerie Annand | 2002 | |
| HN4426 | Elizabeth | John Bromley | 2003 | 2003 |
| HN4427 | Baby's First Christmas | Valerie Annand | 2002 | 2003 |
| HN4428 | Here A Little Child I Stand | Valerie Annand | 2002 | 2002 |
| HN4429 | Do You Wonder Where The Fairies Are | Valerie Annand | 2002 | 2002 |
| HN4430 | Special Moments | C Froud | 2002 | 2004 |
| HN4431 | Jasmine | C Froud | 2002 | 2004 |
| HN4442 | Cherish | Alan Maslankowski | 2002 | 2002 |
| HN4443 | Happy Holidays | Alan Maslankowski | 2002 | 2003 |
| HN4444 | Witch | Alan Maslankowski | 2002 | 2003 |
| HN4445 | Charmed | Alan Maslankowski | 2003 | 2003 |
| HN4446 | Gift of Friendship | Alan Maslankowski | 2003 | 2003 |
| HN4447 | Christmas Dreams | Alan Maslankowski | 2002 | 2003 |
| HN4448 | Father and Son | Alan Maslankowski | 2002 | 2003 |
| HN4449 | A Gift For You | Alan Maslankowski | 2002 | 2006 |
| HN4450 | Linda | Nada M. Pedley | 2002 | 2002 |
| HN4451 | Spring Morning | Nada M. Pedley | 2002 | 2003 |
| HN4452 | Suzanne | Nada M. Pedley | 2002 | 2002 |
| HN4453 | Pride of Scotland | Nada M. Pedley | 2002 | 2004 |
| HN4454 | From the Heart | Nada M. Pedley | 2002 | 2003 |
| HN4456 | Chloe | Nada M. Pedley | 2002 | 2004 |
| HN4457 | Georgia | Nada M. Pedley | 2002 | 2004 |
| HN4458 | Isabel | Nada M. Pedley | 2002 | 2004 |
| HN4459 | Lucy | Nada M. Pedley | 2002 | 2004 |
| HN4461 | Stephanie | Nada M. Pedley | 2002 | 2004 |
| HN4463 | Eleanor | Nada M. Pedley | 2003 | 2003 |
| HN4464 | Happy Birthday | Nada M. Pedley | 2003 | 2003 |
| HN4465 | Lights Out | Nada M. Pedley | 2003 | 2003 |
| HN4466 | Recital | Nada M. Pedley | 2003 | 2003 |
| HN4467 | Katrina | Nada M. Pedley | 2002 | 2004 |
| HN4468 | Deborah | Nada M. Pedley | 2002 | 2004 |
| HN4469 | Spirit of Scotland | Nada M. Pedley | 2003 | 2004 |
| HN4470 | For Someone Special | Nada M. Pedley | 2003 | 2003 |
| HN4474 | Queen Mary II | Pauline Parsons | 2002 | 2002 |
| HN4475 | Queen Victoria | Pauline Parsons | 2003 | 2003 |
| HN4476 | HM Queen Elizabeth II | Pauline Parsons | 2003 | 2003 |
| HN4481 | Alexander the Great | Alan Maslankowski | 2002 | |
| HN4482 | Clever Boy | Alan Maslankowski | 2003 | 2005 |
| HN4483 | Clever Girl | Alan Maslankowski | 2003 | 2005 |
| HN4484 | Father and Daughter | Alan Maslankowski | 2003 | 2007 |
| HN4485 | Unity | Alan Maslankowski | 2003 | 2003 |
| HN4486 | Charge of the Light Brigade | Alan Maslankowski | 2002 | 2002 |
| HN4487 | Farmer | Adrian Hughes | 2003 | |
| HN4488 | Blacksmith | Tim Potts | 2003 | 2006 |
| HN4491 | Little Child So Rare And Sweet | Valerie Annand | 2002 | 2002 |
| HN4492 | Dancing Eyes and Sunny Hair | Valerie Annand | 2002 | 2002 |
| HN4493 | Annabel Vision in Red | Valerie Annand | 2003 | 2004 |
| HN4494 | Home Guard | Valerie Annand | 2002 | 2002 |
| HN4495 | Auxiliary Territorial Service | Valerie Annand | 2002 | 2002 |
| HN4496 | Taylor | Valerie Annand | 2003 | 2004 |
| HN4497 | Helen of Troy | Valerie Annand | 2002 | 2002 |
| HN4498 | Women's Royal Navy Service | Valerie Annand | 2003 | 2003 |
| HN4499 | Alana | Valerie Annand | 2003 | 2004 |

== HN4500 to 4599 ==
| # | Title | Designer(s) | From | To |
|---|---|---|---|---|
| HN4500 | Nadine | Valerie Annand | 2003 | 2004 |
| HN4501 | Forever Yours | John Bromley | 2002 | 2003 |
| HN4503 | Danta Venetian Masquerade Ball - Black | Shane Ridge | 2006 | |
| HN4504 | Aria Venetian Masquerade Ball | Shane Ridge | 2006 | |
| HN4505 | Carlo Venetian Masquerade Ball - Purple | Shane Ridge | 2006 | |
| HN4506 | Allegra Venetian Masquerade Ball | Shane Ridge | 2006 | |
| HN4510 | Pilot Skipper | John Bromley | 2002 | 2002 |
| HN4511 | Fisherman | M Alcock | 2003 | |
| HN4515 | For A Beautiful Boy | | | 2005 |
| HN4516 | For The Sweetest Girl | | | 2005 |
| HN4517 | Footballer | M Alcock | 2004 | 2005 |
| HN4518 | Cricketer | M Nicoll | 2004 | 2005 |
| HN4519 | Hockey Player | M Alcock | 2004 | 2005 |
| HN4520 | April | Nada M. Pedley | 2003 | 2004 |
| HN4521 | Ruby | Nada M. Pedley | 2003 | 2004 |
| HN4522 | Anne Marie | Nada M. Pedley | 2003 | 2004 |
| HN4523 | Faye | Nada M. Pedley | 2003 | 2004 |
| HN4524 | Jayne | Nada M. Pedley | 2003 | 2004 |
| HN4525 | Lisa | Nada M. Pedley | 2003 | 2004 |
| HN4526 | Christine | Nada M. Pedley | 2003 | 2003 |
| HN4527 | Nicole | Nada M. Pedley | 2003 | 2004 |
| HN4528 | Happy Birthday | Nada M. Pedley | 2004 | 2004 |
| HN4529 | Love of Life | Nada M. Pedley | 2003 | 2004 |
| HN4530 | Moonlight Serenade | John Bromley | 2003 | 2004 |
| HN4531 | Message of Love | John Bromley | 2003 | 2004 |
| HN4532 | Susan | John Bromley | 2004 | 2004 |
| HN4533 | Beautiful Blossom | John Bromley | 2003 | 2004 |
| HN4534 | Francesca | John Bromley | 2005 | 2005 |
| HN4535 | Simone | John Bromley | 2005 | 2005 |
| HN4536 | Charlotte | John Bromley | 2005 | 2005 |
| HN4537 | Kristine | John Bromley | 2005 | 2005 |
| HN4538 | A Winter's Morn | John Bromley | 2004 | 2004 |
| HN4539 | Megan | John Bromley | 2004 | 2004 |
| HN4540 | Merlin | Shane Ridge | 2003 | 2003 |
| HN4541 | King Arthur | Shane Ridge | 2003 | 2003 |
| HN4542 | Graduate Female | Shane Ridge | 2004 | 2007 |
| HN4543 | Graduate Male | Shane Ridge | 2004 | 2007 |
| HN4550 | Mikaela | Valerie Annand | 2003 | 2004 |
| HN4551 | Daniella | Valerie Annand | 2003 | 2004 |
| HN4552 | Christmas Day 2003 | Valerie Annand | 2003 | 2003 |
| HN4553 | Dance | Valarie Annand | 2004 | 2004 |
| HN4554 | Women Auxiliary Air Force | Valerie Annand | 2003 | 2003 |
| HN4555 | Air Raid Precaution Warden | Valerie Annand | 2003 | 2003 |
| HN4556 | Hayley | Valerie Annand | 2003 | 2003 |
| HN4557 | Alexandra | Valerie Annand | 2003 | 2003 |
| HN4558 | Christmas Day 2004 | Valerie Annand | 2004 | 2004 |
| HN4559 | Rose Garden | Valerie Annand | 2004 | 2004 |
| HN4560 | Secret | Alan Maslankowski | 2004 | 2004 |
| HN4561 | Hercules | Alan Maslankowski | 2003 | |
| HN4562 | Mother and Daughter | Alan Maslankowski | 2003 | 2007 |
| HN4563 | Studious Boy | Alan Maslankowski | 2003 | |
| HN4564 | Studious Girl | Alan Maslankowski | 2003 | |
| HN4565 | Hope | Alan Maslankowski | 2003 | 2003 |
| HN4566 | Matador and Bull | Alan Maslankowski | 2004 | |
| HN4567 | Harmony | Alan Maslankowski | 2004 | 2004 |
| HN4568 | Peace | Alan Maslankowski | 2006 | 2006 |
| HN4569 | Joy | Alan Maslankowski | 2004 | 2005 |
| HN4570 | Lifeboat Man | Adrian Hughes | 2003 | |
| HN4571 | Lady Emily Rose | | 2006 | 2006 |
| HN4580 | Irish Charm | Nada M. Pedley | 2004 | 2004 |
| HN4581 | Rose | Nada M. Pedley | 2004 | 2004 |
| HN4582 | Sweet Memories | Nada M. Pedley | 2003 | 2004 |
| HN4583 | Jessica | Nada M. Pedley | 2003 | 2004 |
| HN4584 | Andrea | Nada M. Pedley | 2003 | 2004 |
| HN4585 | Thinking Of You | Nada M. Pedley | 2003 | 2004 |
| HN4586 | Springtime | Nada M. Pedley | 2004 | 2004 |
| HN4587 | Summer Breeze | Nada M. Pedley | 2005 | 2005 |
| HN4588 | Autumn Stroll | Nada M. Pedley | 2006 | 2006 |
| HN4589 | Winter's Day | Nada M. Pedley | 2007 | |
| HN4596 | Queen Alexandra Nurse | M Alcock | 2004 | 2004 |
| HN4599 | Bathing Beauty | Nada M. Pedley | 2003 | 2003 |

== HN4600 to 4699 ==
| # | Title | Designer(s) | From | To |
|---|---|---|---|---|
| HN4600 | Brighton Belle | Nada M. Pedley | 2003 | 2003 |
| HN4601 | Summer's Darling | Nada M. Pedley | 2003 | 2003 |
| HN4602 | Taking The Waters | Nada M. Pedley | 2003 | 2003 |
| HN4603 | Dawn | Nada M. Pedley | 2004 | 2004 |
| HN4604 | Happy Anniversary | Nada M. Pedley | 2004 | 2004 |
| HN4605 | Happy Anniversary | Nada M. Pedley | 2004 | 2004 |
| HN4606 | Happy Anniversary | Nada M. Pedley | 2004 | 2004 |
| HN4607 | Magical Moments | Nada M. Pedley | 2004 | 2004 |
| HN4608 | Heart of Scotland | Nada M. Pedley | 2004 | 2005 |
| HN4609 | Free Spirit | Nada M. Pedley | 2004 | 2005 |
| HN4610 | Harmony | N Welch | 2005 | 2005 |
| HN4611 | Contentment | N Welch | 2005 | 2005 |
| HN4620 | Sophie | John Bromley | 2004 | 2004 |
| HN4621 | True Love | John Bromley | 2004 | 2004 |
| HN4622 | A Winter's Morn | John Bromley | 2004 | 2004 |
| HN4623 | Victoria | John Bromley | 2005 | 2005 |
| HN4624 | Eleanor | John Bromley | 2004 | 2004 |
| HN4625 | Sweet Devotion | John Bromley | 2004 | 2004 |
| HN4626 | Summer Breeze | John Bromley | 2005 | 2005 |
| HN4627 | Summer Breeze | John Bromley | 2005 | 2005 |
| HN4632 | Sailor | John Bromley | 2004 | 2004 |
| HN4635 | Bowler | Tim Potts | 2003 | 2003 |
| HN4640 | Love | Alan Maslankowski | 2005 | 2005 |
| HN4641 | Lady Godiva | Alan Maslankowski | 2004 | |
| HN4643 | Best Friends | Alan Maslankowski | 2004 | 2007 |
| HN4644 | Two Become One | Alan Maslankowski | 2004 | 2005 |
| HN4645 | Family | Alan Maslankowski | 2004 | 2007 |
| HN4646 | The Moor | | 2005 | |
| HN4650 | Country Veterinarian | M Alcock | 2004 | |
| HN4651 | Town Veterinarian | M Alcock | 2004 | 2006 |
| HN4654 | Michael Doulton | | 2005 | |
| HN4660 | Summer's Dream | Nada M. Pedley | 2004 | 2005 |
| HN4661 | Naomi | Nada M. Pedley | 2004 | 2004 |
| HN4662 | Rosemary | Nada M. Pedley | 2004 | 2004 |
| HN4663 | Fleur | Nada M. Pedley | 2004 | 2004 |
| HN4664 | Abigail | Nada M. Pedley | 2004 | 2004 |
| HN4665 | Laura | Nada M. Pedley | 2004 | 2004 |
| HN4666 | Caitlyn | Nada M. Pedley | 2004 | 2004 |
| HN4667 | Alison | Nada M. Pedley | 2004 | 2004 |
| HN4668 | Sandra | Nada M. Pedley | 2005 | 2005 |
| HN4675 | Victorian Christmas | Valerie Annand | 2004 | 2004 |
| HN4676 | | | | |
| HN4677 | | | | |
| HN4678 | | | | |
| HN4679 | | | | |
| HN4680 | Mother and Son | | 2005 | 2007 |
| HN4681 | First Kiss | | 2005 | 2006 |
| HN4682 | Playmates | | 2005 | |
| HN4683 | Carefree | M Alcock | 2005 | 2005 |
| HN4684 | | | | |
| HN4685 | | | | |
| HN4686 | Autumn Stroll | John Bromley | 2004 | 2004 |
| HN4687 | Autumn Storll | | | |
| HN4688 | Deborah | | | |
| HN4689 | A Winter's Walk | | | |
| HN4690 | A Winter's Walk | | | |
| HN4691 | Lorelei | | | |
| HN4692 | Marina | | | |
| HN4693 | Siren | | | |
| HN4694 | Dauphin | | | |
| HN4695 | Lawrence of Arabia | | 2006 | |
| HN4696 | Nelson | | | |
| HN4697 | Welcome Home | | | |
| HN4698 | The Hero Returns | | | |
| HN4699 | | | | |

== HN4700 to 4799 ==
| # | Title | Designer(s) | From | To |
|---|---|---|---|---|
| HN4700 | Mary | | 2004 | 2005 |
| HN4701 | Joseph | | 2004 | 2007 |
| HN4702 | Mechior | | 2004 | 2005 |
| HN4703 | Balthazar | | 2004 | 2004 |
| HN4704 | Gaspar | | 2004 | 2005 |
| HN4705 | | | | |
| HN4706 | | | | |
| HN4707 | Jesus | | 2004 | 2004 |
| HN4708 | | | | |
| HN4709 | | | | |
| HN4710 | | | | |
| HN4711 | Joanna | Alan Maslankowski | 2005 | 2005 |
| HN4712 | Welsh Lady | Valerie Annand | 2004 | 2004 |
| HN4713 | Rooftop Santa | | 2004 | 2004 |
| HN4714 | Santa Claus | | 2004 | 2004 |
| HN4715 | Santa Claus | | 2004 | 2004 |
| HN4716 | Autumn Breeze | Leslie Harradine | 2005 | |
| HN4717 | Ninette | | 2005 | |
| HN4718 | Elaine | Margaret Davies | 2005 | |
| HN4719 | Fair Lady | Margaret Davies | 2005 | 2007 |
| HN4720 | Sara | Margaret Davies | 2005 | |
| HN4721 | Christmas Celebration | Valerie Annand | 2005 | |
| HN4722 | Happy Birthday | Nada M. Pedley | 2005 | 2005 |
| HN4723 | Christmas Day 2005 | | 2005 | 2005 |
| HN4724 | Annie | | | |
| HN4725 | Mollie | | 2005 | 2007 |
| HN4726 | Enchanted Evening | | 2005 | 2007 |
| HN4727 | Chloe | Valerie Annand | 2005 | 2005 |
| HN4728 | Lucette | | 2005 | 2007 |
| HN4729 | May Blossom | | | |
| HN4730 | Eileen | Nada M. Pedley | 2005 | 2005 |
| HN4731 | Sweet Rose | | 2005 | 2007 |
| HN4732 | Tender Love | | | |
| HN4733 | Pearl | Nada M. Pedley | 2005 | 2007 |
| HN4734 | In My Heart | | | |
| HN4735 | Deborah | Nada M. Pedley | 2005 | 2005 |
| HN4736 | Loyal Friend | Nada M. Pedley | 2005 | 2005 |
| HN4737 | Love Song | Nada M. Pedley | 2005 | 2005 |
| HN4738 | Patricia | Nada M. Pedley | 2005 | |
| HN4739 | Louise | | 2005 | 2005 |
| HN4740 | Sweet Innocence | | 2005 | 2005 |
| HN4741 | Rose of the Glen | | 2005 | 2007 |
| HN4742 | Rachel | Nada M. Pedley | 2005 | 2005 |
| HN4743 | Highland Belle | | | |
| HN4744 | Special Gift | Nada M. Pedley | 2005 | |
| HN4745 | Treasured Moments | John Bromley | 2005 | |
| HN4746 | With Love | John Bromley | 2005 | |
| HN4747 | All My Love | Nada M. Pedley | 2005 | |
| HN4748 | Congratulations | | | |
| HN4749 | Special Wishes | John Bromley | 2005 | |
| HN4750 | Especially For You | John Bromley | 2005 | |
| HN4751 | Gift of Love | John Bromley | 2005 | |
| HN4752 | | | | |
| HN4753 | | | | |
| HN4754 | | | | |
| HN4755 | Autumn Days | Leslie Harradine | 2005 | 2005 |
| HN4756 | Helen | | 2005 | 2007 |
| HN4757 | Christmas Day | | 2005 | 2005 |
| HN4758 | Charlotte | Nada M. Pedley | 2005 | 2005 |
| HN4759 | A Moment in Time | | 2005 | 2005 |
| HN4760 | Amy | Nada M. Pedley | 2005 | |
| HN4761 | Contemplation | N Walsh | 2005 | 2005 |
| HN4762 | Courtney | Valarie Annand | 2005 | 2005 |
| HN4763 | Jessie | Valerie Annand | 2005 | 2005 |
| HN4764 | Diana | John Bromley | 2005 | |
| HN4765 | Midnight Premier | John Bromley | 2005 | 2007 |
| HN4766 | Olivia | Nada M. Pedley | 2005 | 2007 |
| HN4767 | Paige | Valerie Annand | 2005 | 2005 |
| HN4768 | Rebecca | John Bromley | 2005 | |
| HN4769 | Serenity | N Walsh | 2005 | 2005 |
| HN4770 | Tranquility | N Walsh | 2005 | 2005 |
| HN4771 | Tiffany | Valerie Annand | 2005 | 2005 |
| HN4772 | | | | |
| HN4773 | | | | |
| HN4774 | Vicki | Nada M. Pedley | 2005 | 2005 |
| HN4775 | Juliette | | | |
| HN4776 | Cathy | | | |
| HN4777 | Susan | Pauline Parsons | 2005 | |
| HN4778 | Top ‘O The Hill | Leslie Harradine | 2005 | |
| HN4779 | Karen | Margaret Davies | 2005 | |
| HN4780 | Rachel | Peter Gee | 2005 | |
| HN4781 | Kirsty | Margaret Davies | 2005 | 2007 |
| HN4782 | Amy | Peter Gee | 2005 | 2005 |
| HN4783 | Kirsty | | | |
| HN4784 | Guy Fawkes | Shane Ridge | 2005 | 2005 |
| HN4785 | Caroline | | 2005 | 2006 |
| HN4786 | Emma | | | |
| HN4787 | Alice | | | |
| HN4788 | Loving Thoughts | John Bromley | 2006 | |
| HN4789 | Evening Elegance | | | |
| HN4790 | Megan | | 2005 | 2005 |
| HN4791 | Alexandra | | | |
| HN4792 | Lauren | | | |
| HN4793 | Lady Sarah Jane | | 2005 | 2005 |
| HN4794 | For You Mother | | 2005 | |
| HN4795 | A Special Lady | | | |
| HN4796 | Kristen | Chris Jackson | 2005 | |
| HN4797 | Rose Bouquet | | 2005 | 2005 |
| HN4798 | | | | |
| HN4799 | Mrs. Claus | | | |

== HN4800 to 4899 ==
| # | Title | Designer(s) | From | To |
|---|---|---|---|---|
| HN4800 | Santa's Surprise | | | |
| HN4801 | Santa's List | | | |
| HN4802 | Mary | Nada M. Pedley | 2006 | 2006 |
| HN4803 | Annabel | | 2005 | 2007 |
| HN4804 | Gail | | 2005 | |
| HN4805 | Buttercup | | 2005 | 2007 |
| HN4806 | Helen | | 2005 | 2007 |
| HN4807 | Flower Seller Children | | 2006 | |
| HN4808 | Silks and Ribbons | | 2006 | |
| HN4809 | Old Balloon Seller | | 2006 | |
| HN4810 | Orange Lady | | 2006 | |
| HN4811 | Granny's Heritage | | 2006 | |
| HN4812 | Romany Sue | | 2006 | |
| HN4813 | Emma | | 2006 | 2006 |
| HN4814 | Shannon | | 2006 | 2006 |
| HN4815 | Cherish | | 2005 | 2006 |
| HN4816 | Welsh Lady 'Cariad' | | | |
| HN4817 | Emily | | 2006 | 2006 |
| HN4818 | | | | |
| HN4819 | | | | |
| HN4820 | 730 Days | | | |
| HN4821 | Megan | | 2006 | 2007 |
| HN4822 | Happy Birthday | | 2006 | 2006 |
| HN4823 | Jessica | | 2006 | |
| HN4824 | Abigail | | | |
| HN4825 | Wintertime | | | |
| HN4826 | Wintertime | | | |
| HN4827 | | | | |
| HN4828 | | | | |
| HN4829 | | | | |
| HN4830 | Elizabeth | | | |
| HN4831 | Lauren | | | |
| HN4832 | Madison | | | |
| HN4833 | Alyssa | | 2006 | |
| HN4834 | Ashley | | | |
| HN4835 | | | | |
| HN4836 | Olivia | | | |
| HN4837 | Gabriella | | | |
| HN4838 | Samantha | | 2005 | |
| HN4839 | Abigail | | | |
| HN4840 | Emma | | | |
| HN4841 | Emily | | 2005 | |
| HN4842 | Pony Express | Allan Maslankowski | | |
| HN4843 | | | | |
| HN4844 | | | | |
| HN4845 | | | | |
| HN4846 | The Peacock | Valerie Annand | 2006 | |
| HN4847 | Holly Blue | Valerie Annand | 2006 | |
| HN4848 | | | | |
| HN4849 | Painted Lady | | | |
| HN4850 | | | | |
| HN4851 | Lauren | | | |
| HN4852 | | | | |
| HN4853 | Winter's Eve | | | |
| HN4854 | Chloe | | 2006 | |
| HN4855 | Hannah | | 2006 | |
| HN4856 | Sophie | | 2006 | |
| HN4857 | Elizabeth | | 2006 | |
| HN4858 | Abigail | | 2006 | |
| HN4859 | Katie | | 2006 | |
| HN4860 | Laura | | 2006 | |
| HN4861 | Stephanie | | 2006 | |
| HN4862 | Barbara | | 2006 | |
| HN4863 | Bess (Best of the Classics series) | Lesslie Harradine | 2006 | 2007 |
| HN4864 | Soiree | | 2006 | |
| HN4865 | Elaine | | 2006 | |
| HN4866 | Eve | Tim Potts | 2007 | |
| HN4867 | Phillipa | Tim Potts | 2007 | |
| HN4868 | Julia | Tim Potts | 2007 | |
| HN4869 | A New Life | Pauline Parsons | 2006 | 2006 |
| HN4870 | Forever Yours | | 2006 | |
| HN4871 | Special Moment | | 2006 | |
| HN4872 | Perfect Gift | | 2006 | |
| HN4873 | Eternal Love | | 2006 | |
| HN4874 | Elizabeth | | | |
| HN4875 | January | | 2006 | 2006 |
| HN4876 | February | | 2006 | 2006 |
| HN4877 | March | | 2006 | 2006 |
| HN4878 | April | | 2006 | 2006 |
| HN4879 | May | | 2006 | 2006 |
| HN4880 | June | | 2006 | 2006 |
| HN4881 | July | | 2006 | 2006 |
| HN4882 | August | | 2006 | 2006 |
| HN4883 | September | | 2006 | 2006 |
| HN4884 | October | | 2006 | 2006 |
| HN4885 | November | | 2006 | 2006 |
| HN4886 | December | | 2006 | 2006 |
| HN4887 | Horse Nightfall | | | |
| HN4888 | Erin | | 2006 | 2006 |
| HN4889 | Butterfly Lady #1 - Peacock | | | |
| HN4890 | Aldena | | | |
| HN4891 | | | | |
| HN4892 | | | | |
| HN4893 | | | | |
| HN4894 | A Christmas Morning | | | |
| HN4895 | From the Heart | Nada M. Pedley | | |
| HN4896 | Pony Express | Alan Maslankowski and David Capewell | | |
| HN4897 | The Waltz | | | |
| HN4898 | Festive Wishes | | | |
| HN4899 | Christmas Day 2006 | Valerie Annand | 2006 | 2006 |

== HN4900 to 4999 ==
| # | Title | Designer(s) | From | To |
|---|---|---|---|---|
| HN4900 | Queen Mary | Pauline Parsons | | |
| HN4901 | | | | |
| HN4902 | | | | |
| HN4903 | | | | |
| HN4904 | | | | |
| HN4905 | | | | |
| HN4906 | Grace | T Mason | 2006 | 2007 |
| HN4907 | Stephanie | John Bromley | 2007 | 2007 |
| HN4908 | Happy Birthday | D Capewell | 2007 | |
| HN4909 | Amanda | John Bromley | 2007 | |
| HN4910 | Catherine | John Bromley | 2007 | |
| HN4911 | Christmas Day | | 2007 | 2007 |
| HN4912 | Jennifer | Nada M. Pedley | 2006 | |
| HN4913 | Melissa | | 2006 | |
| HN4914 | Andrea | Nada M. Pedley | 2006 | |
| HN4915 | Michelle | Nada M. Pedley | 2006 | |
| HN4916 | Precious | Nada M. Pedley | 2006 | |
| HN4917 | Heather | | 2006 | |
| HN4918 | Lucy | | 2006 | |
| HN4919 | Charlotte | | 2006 | |
| HN4920 | Holly | | 2006 | |
| HN4921 | Isabella | | 2006 | |
| HN4922 | Emma | | 2006 | |
| HN4923 | Lauren | | 2006 | |
| HN4924 | Patricia | | 2007 | 2007 |
| HN4925 | Christmas Day | | 2006 | 2006 |
| HN4926 | Kathy | | 2006 | |
| HN4927 | Margaret | | 2006 | |
| HN4928 | Alexandra | | 2006 | |
| HN4929 | Coralie | | 2006 | |
| HN4930 | Christine | | 2006 | |
| HN4931 | Fragrance | | 2006 | |
| HN4932 | Southern Belle | | 2006 | |
| HN4933 | Biddy Penny Farthing | | 2006 | |
| HN4934 | Mask Seller | | 2006 | |
| HN4935 | The Little Mother | | 2006 | |
| HN4936 | All A Blooming | | 2006 | |
| HN4937 | The Old Lavender Seller | | 2006 | |
| HN4938 | Two A Penny | | 2006 | |
| HN4939 | Leonardo da Vinci | Alan Maslankowski and David Capewell | 2007 | 2007 |
| HN4940 | Isambard Kingdom Brunel | Alan Maslankowski and David Capewell | | |
| HN4941 | The Head Gardener | Shane Ridge and David Capewell | | |
| HN4942 | Welcome Home (US Colourway) | Alan Maslankowski and David Capewell | | |
| HN4943 | Hero Returns (US Colourway) | Alan Maslankowski and David Capewell | | |
| HN4944 | A Moment To Remember | | 2006 | 2006 |
| HN4945 | My Christmas Wish | | 2006 | 2006 |
| HN4946 | Cookies for Santa | | | |
| HN4947 | Miracle of Light | | 2006 | 2006 |
| HN4948 | Kathryn | | | |
| HN4949 | Charlotte | | | |
| HN4950 | A New Life | | | |
| HN4951 | Forever Yours | | | |
| HN4952 | Special Moment | | | |
| HN4953 | Perfect Gift | | | |
| HN4954 | Eternal Love | | | |
| HN4955 | | | | |
| HN4956 | | | | |
| HN4957 | An Afternoon Stroll | Adrian Hughes | 2006 | |
| HN4958 | Constance | Adrian Hughes | | |
| HN4959 | Florence | | | |
| HN4960 | Evelyn | | | |
| HN4961 | Lois | | | |
| HN4962 | Mardi Gras - Giselle | | | |
| HN4963 | Mardi Gras - Paulo | | | |
| HN4964 | Mardi Gras - Carmen | | | |
| HN4965 | Mardi Gras - Diego | | | |
| HN4966 | Lady Anna Louise | Valerie Annand | 2007 | |
| HN4967 | RAF Corporal | Alan Maslankowski and David Capewell | | |
| HN4968 | Telynores (The Harpist) | | | |
| HN4969 | Louisa | | | |
| HN4970 | January - Garnet | | 2007 | |
| HN4971 | February - Amethyst | | 2007 | |
| HN4972 | March - Aquamarine | | 2007 | |
| HN4973 | April - Diamond | | 2007 | |
| HN4974 | May - Emerald | | 2007 | |
| HN4975 | June - Pearl | | 2007 | |
| HN4976 | July - Ruby | | 2007 | |
| HN4977 | August - Peridot | | 2007 | |
| HN4978 | September - Sapphire | | 2007 | |
| HN4979 | October - Opal | | 2007 | 2007 |
| HN4980 | November - Topaz | | 2007 | |
| HN4981 | December - Turquoise | | 2007 | |
| HN4982 | Elegant Rose | | 2007 | |
| HN4983 | Moonlight Waltz | | 2007 | |
| HN4984 | Flowers of Love | | 2007 | |
| HN4985 | First Time Skater | | 2007 | 2007 |
| HN4986 | Special Friend | | 2007 | |
| HN4987 | | | | |
| HN4988 | Summer Stroll | | 2007 | |
| HN4989 | | | | |
| HN4990 | | | | |
| HN4991 | | | | |
| HN4992 | | | | |
| HN4993 | Theresa | | 2007 | |
| HN4994 | Ruth | | 2007 | |
| HN4995 | Naomi | Tim Potts | 2007 | |
| HN4996 | Hilary | Peggy Davies | 2007 | |
| HN4997 | Southern Belle | Margaret Davies | 2007 | |
| HN4998 | Carol | Pauline Parsons | 2007 | |
| HN4999 | Hannah | Nada M. Pedley | 2007 | |

== HN5000 to 5099 ==
| # | Title | Designer(s) | From | To |
|---|---|---|---|---|
| HN5000 | Lily | Peggy Davies | 2007 | |
| HN5001 | Sweet Sixteen | | 2007 | 2007 |
| HN5002 | Everlasting Love | | 2007 | 2007 |
| HN5003 | Tender Moment | | 2007 | |
| HN5004 | Daddy's Girl | | 2007 | |
| HN5005 | Friendship | | 2007 | |
| HN5006 | Loving You | | 2007 | |
| HN5007 | Special Bond | | | |
| HN5008 | Dreaming | | 2007 | |
| HN5009 | Darling | | 2007 | 2007 |
| HN5010 | Hayley | | 2007 | |
| HN5011 | Victoria | | 2007 | |
| HN5012 | Natalie | | 2007 | |
| HN5013 | Gabriella | | 2007 | |
| HN5014 | Alicia | Nada M. Pedley | | |
| HN5015 | Jasmine | Nada M. Pedley | 2007 | |
| HN5016 | Mary | | 2007 | |
| HN5017 | Susan | | 2007 | |
| HN5018 | Deborah | | 2007 | |
| HN5019 | Linda | | 2007 | |
| HN5020 | Sandra | | 2007 | |
| HN5021 | Karen | | 2007 | |
| HN5022 | The Civilian Wedding | | | |
| HN5023 | | | | |
| HN5024 | Just for You- Pretty Ladies Figurine | | 2007 | |
| HN5025 | | | | |
| HN5026 | | | | |
| HN5027 | | | | |
| HN5028 | | | | |
| HN5029 | English Rose | Nada M. Pedley | 2007 | |
| HN5030 | Scottish Pride | Nada M. Pedley | 2007 | |
| HN5031 | Irish Charm | Nada M. Pedley | 2007 | |
| HN5032 | Welsh Beauty | Nada M. Pedley | 2007 | |
| HN5033 | Thoughts of You | | 2007 | |
| HN5034 | Elizabeth | Elizabeth Emanuel | 2007 | 2008 |
| HN5035 | Bride (Traditional Bride) | | 2007 | |
| HN5036 | My Special Day (Contemporary Bride) | | 2007 | |
| HN5037 | Our Wedding Day (Cake Topper) | | 2007 | |
| HN5038 | Graduate (Male) | | | |
| HN5039 | Graduate (Female) | | 2007 | |
| HN5040 | Father Christmas | | 2007 | 2007 |
| HN5041 | Tranquillity | | 2007 | |
| HN5042 | Harmony | | 2007 | |
| HN5043 | Melody | | 2007 | |
| HN5044 | Serenity | | 2007 | |
| HN5045 | Contentment | | 2007 | |
| HN5046 | Carefree | | 2007 | |
| HN5047 | | | | |
| HN5048 | Rosita | Peter Holland | 2007 | 2008 |
| HN5049 | Golden Eagle "Storm" | Alan Maslankowski and David Capewell | 2007 | 2007 |
| HN5050 | Brown Eagle "Tempest" | Alan Maslankowski and David Capewell | 2007 | 2007 |
| HN5051 | Sir Isaac Newton | Robert Tabbenor and David Capewell | 2007 | 2007 |
| HN5052 | Alexander Graham Bell | Robert Tabbenor and David Capewell | 2007 | 2007 |
| HN5053 | Sunburst | | 2007 | 2007 |
| HN5054 | Moonlight | | 2007 | 2007 |
| HN5055 | The Taming of Pegasus | | 2007 | |
| HN5056 | Shall We Dance | | 2007 | 2007 |
| HN5057 | Maria | | | |
| HN5058 | Vanessa | | | |
| HN5059 | Carmen | | | |
| HN5060 | Christina | | 2008 | 2008 |
| HN5061 | Diana Princess of Wales | | 2007 | |
| HN5062 | | | | |
| HN5063 | Kate | | | |
| HN5064 | With Love | | 2007 | |
| HN5065 | Holly Blue Butterfly | | 2007 | |
| HN5066 | Diana Princess of Wales | Tim Potts | 2007 | |
| HN5067 | | | | |
| HN5068 | | | | |
| HN5069 | | | | |
| HN5070 | | | | |
| HN5071 | | | | |
| HN5072 | | | | |
| HN5073 | | | | |
| HN5074 | | | | |
| HN5075 | | | | |
| HN5076 | | | | |
| HN5077 | | | | |
| HN5078 | | | | |
| HN5079 | | | | |
| HN5080 | Scottish Pride | | 2007 | |
| HN5081 | | | | |
| HN5082 | | | | |
| HN5083 | Affection (Charity Figure 2008) | Nada M. Pedley | 2008 | 2008 |
| HN5084 | | | | |
| HN5085 | | | | |
| HN5086 | | | | |
| HN5087 | | | | |
| HN5088 | | | | |
| HN5089 | | | | |
| HN5090 | Jennifer (Petite of the Year 2008) | Peter Gee | 2008 | 2008 |
| HN5091 | Clare | | 2007 | |
| HN5092 | Elegance | | 2007 | |
| HN5093 | First Waltz | | 2007 | |
| HN5094 | Nicola | | 2007 | |
| HN5095 | Sunday Best | Margaret Davies | 2007 | |
| HN5096 | Blossom Time | | 2007 | |
| HN5097 | Christmas Day 2007 | | 2007 | 2007 |
| HN5098 | Carla | | 2008 | |
| HN5099 | Thank You | Zoe Annand | 2007 | |

== HN5100 to 5199 ==
| # | Title | Designer(s) | From | To |
|---|---|---|---|---|
| HN5100 | My Love | Zoe Annand | 2007 | Present |
| HN5101 | Congratulations | Zoe Annand | 2007 | Present |
| HN5102 | Especially for You | Zoe Annand | 2007 | Present |
| HN5103 | My Darling | Zoe Annand | 2007 | Present |
| HN5104 | Loving Thoughts | Zoe Annand | 2007 | Present |
| HN5105 | Special Memories | Nada M. Pedley | 2007 | 2007 |
| HN5106 | Spring Dreams | Zoe Annand | 2007 | Present |
| HN5107 | Summer's Belle | Zoe Annand | 2007 | Present |
| HN5108 | Forever Autumn | Zoe Annand | 2007 | Present |
| HN5109 | Winter Elegance | Zoe Annand | 2007 | Present |
| HN5110 | Night To Remember | | 2008 | Present |
| HN5111 | Santa's Journey | | 2007 | 2007 |
| HN5112 | Santa's Finishing Touch | | 2007 | 2007 |
| HN5113 | Santa | | 2007 | 2007 |
| HN5114 | Olivia | John Bromley | 2008 | 2008 |
| HN5115 | Anabel | John Bromley | 2008 | 2008 |
| HN5116 | Lily | John Bromley | 2008 | 2008 |
| HN5117 | Happy Birthday 2008 | John Bromley | 2008 | 2008 |
| HN5118 | | | | |
| HN5119 | | | | |
| HN5120 | | | | |
| HN5121 | | | | |
| HN5122 | | | | |
| HN5123 | | | | |
| HN5124 | | | | |
| HN5125 | | | | |
| HN5126 | | | | |
| HN5127 | Dolphin Splendor | Robert Tabbenor and David Capewell | 2007 | 2007 |
| HN5128 | Thomas Edison | Robert Tabbenor and David Capewell | 2007 | 2007 |
| HN5129 | William Shakespeare | Robert Tabbenor and David Capewell | 2007 | 2007 |
| HN5130 | Glad Tidings | Adrian Hughes | 2007 | 2007 |
| HN5131 | Lady Victoria May | Tim Potts | 2008 | 2008 |
| HN5132 | Bonita (Rio Carnival) | Shane Ridge | 2007 | 2007 |
| HN5133 | Chiquita (Rio Carnival) | Shane Ridge | 2007 | 2007 |
| HN5134 | Lola (Rio Carnival) | Shane Ridge | 2007 | 2007 |
| HN5135 | Milena (Rio Carnival) | Shane Ridge | 2007 | 2007 |
| HN5136 | Welsh Lady Springtime – Y Gymraes Gwanwyn | Valerie Annand | 2007 | 2007 |
| HN5137 | | | | |
| HN5138 | | | | |
| HN5139 | To Mother With Love | | 2008 | |
| HN5140 | Just For You | Zoe Annand | 2008 | |
| HN5141 | To Someone Special | Zoe Annand | 2008 | |
| HN5142 | Best Wishes | Zoe Annand | 2008 | |
| HN5143 | From the Heart | Zoe Annand | 2008 | |
| HN5144 | Thinking Of You | Zoe Annand | 2008 | |
| HN5145 | | | | |
| HN5146 | Christmas Celebration 2007 | Zoe Annand | 2007 | 2007 |
| HN5147 | | | | |
| HN5148 | | | | |
| HN5149 | | | | |
| HN5150 | | | | |
| HN5151 | | | | |
| HN5152 | | | | |
| HN5153 | | | | |
| HN5154 | | | | |
| HN5155 | | | | |
| HN5156 | | | | |
| HN5157 | | | | |
| HN5158 | | | | |
| HN5159 | A Gift For Mother | | 2007 | |
| HN5160 | | | | |
| HN5161 | | | | |
| HN5162 | | | | |
| HN5163 | Grace | | 2008 | |
| HN5164 | Janine | | 2008 | |
| HN5165 | | | | |
| HN5166 | | | | |
| HN5167 | Gift of Love | | 2008 | |
| HN5168 | On the First Day of Christmas | | 2009 | |
| HN5169 | On the Second Day of Christmas | | 2009 | |
| HN5170 | On the Third Day of Christmas | | 2009 | |
| HN5171 | On the Fourth Day of Christmas | | 2009 | |
| HN5172 | On the Fifth Day of Christmas | | 2009 | |
| HN5173 | On the Sixth Day of Christmas | | 2008 | |
| HN5174 | | | | |
| HN5175 | | | | |
| HN5176 | | | | |
| HN5177 | | | | |
| HN5178 | | | | |
| HN5179 | | | | |
| HN5180 | Family | | 2009 | |
| HN5181 | | | | |
| HN5182 | | | | |
| HN5183 | | | | |
| HN5184 | | | | |
| HN5185 | | | | |
| HN5186 | | | | |
| HN5187 | Hannah | | 2008 | |
| HN5188 | Georgia (Earth) | Neil Faulkner | 2008 | |
| HN5189 | Brooke (Water) | | 2009 | |
| HN5190 | Elaine (Fire) | | 2010 | |
| HN5191 | Kari Wind | | 2011 | |
| HN5192 | Dorothy | | 2008 | |
| HN5193 | Enchanted Evening | | 2008 | |
| HN5194 | | | | |
| HN5195 | Ludwig van Beethoven | Robert F. Tabbenor | 2008 | 2008 |
| HN5196 | Michael Faraday | Robert F. Tabbenor | 2008 | 2008 |
| HN5197 | Beekeeper | Shane Ridge | 2008 | 2008 |
| HN5198 | Spring Blossom | Adrian Hughes | 2008 | 2008 |
| HN5199 | Summer Bouquet | Adrian Hughes | 2008 | 2008 |

== HN5200 to 5299 ==
| # | Title | Designer(s) | From | To |
|---|---|---|---|---|
| HN5200 | Autumn Harvest | Adrian Hughes | 2008 | 2008 |
| HN5201 | Winter Festival | Adrian Hughes | 2008 | 2008 |
| HN5202 | From This Day Forth | Adrian Hughes | 2008 | 2008 |
| HN5203 | | | | |
| HN5204 | | | | |
| HN5205 | | | | |
| HN5206 | | | | |
| HN5207 | | | | |
| HN5208 | The Mogul | Robert F. Tabbenor | 2008 | 2008 |
| HN5209 | Christmas Day | Valarie Annand | 2008 | |
| HN5210 | | | | |
| HN5211 | | | | |
| HN5212 | Wee Scottish Lass | | 2008 | |
| HN5213 | | | | |
| HN5214 | | | | |
| HN5215 | | | | |
| HN5216 | | | | |
| HN5217 | | | | |
| HN5218 | | | | |
| HN5219 | Victoria | Nada M. Pedley | 2008 | |
| HN5220 | | | | |
| HN5221 | | | | |
| HN5222 | | | | |
| HN5223 | | | | |
| HN5224 | | | | |
| HN5225 | Anne Arrives at Green Gables | Nada M. Pedley | 2008 | |
| HN5226 | Samantha | Nada M. Pedley | 2009 | |
| HN5227 | | | | |
| HN5228 | A Gift For You | | 2008 | |
| HN5229 | Christmas Rose | John Bromley | | |
| HN5230 | | | | |
| HN5231 | | | | |
| HN5232 | Christmas Day | Valarie Annand | 2008 | |
| HN5233 | | | | |
| HN5234 | | | | |
| HN5235 | A Special Day | | | 2009 |
| HN5236 | Katherine | Nada M. Pedley | 2008 | |
| HN5237 | Marnie (Commissioned for TVSN Australia) | C. Jackson | 2008 | |
| HN5238 | For You Mother | Neil Faulkner | | |
| HN5239 | Charles Darwin | Robert F. Tabbenor | 2008 | |
| HN5240 | Albert Einstein | Robert F. Tabbenor | 2008 | |
| HN5241 | Thomas Jefferson | Robert F. Tabbenor | 2008 | |
| HN5242 | Abraham Lincoln | Robert F. Tabbenor | 2008 | |
| HN5243 | | | | |
| HN5244 | | | | |
| HN5245 | | | | |
| HN5246 | | | | |
| HN5247 | Lawrence of Arabia | Shane Ridge | 2008 | |
| HN5248 | Grace | Valarie Annand | 2009 | 2009 |
| HN5249 | Happy Birthday | John Bromley | 2008 | 2009 |
| HN5250 | Tender is The Heart | Neil Faulkner | 2008 | 2009 |
| HN5251 | Hannah | John Bromley | 2008 | 2009 |
| HN5253 | A Loving Thought | Neil Faulkner | 2008 | 2009 |
| HN5254 | Christmas Day | | 2009 | |
| HN5255 | Spring Stroll | John Bromley | 2008 | |
| HN5256 | Summer Dance | John Bromley | 2008 | |
| HN5257 | Autumn Walk | John Bromley | 2008 | |
| HN5258 | Winter Fun | | 2008 | |
| HN5259 | Emily | Neil Faulkner | 2008 | |
| HN5260 | Samantha | Neil Faulkner | 2008 | |
| HN5261 | Lisa | Neil Faulkner | 2008 | |
| HN5262 | | | | |
| HN5263 | | | | |
| HN5264 | | | | |
| HN5265 | Thinking of You | | 2008 | |
| HN5266 | Loving Thoughts | | 2008 | |
| HN5267 | To Someone Special | | 2008 | |
| HN5268 | Deborah | Nada M. Pedley | 2008 | 2009 |
| HN5269 | Christmas Day | | 2008 | |
| HN5270 | Buttercup | | 2008 | |
| HN5271 | Fragrance | | 2008 | |
| HN5272 | Autumn Breeze | | 2008 | |
| HN5273 | Elaine (Fire) | | 2008 | |
| HN5274 | Fair Lady | | 2008 | |
| HN5275 | Ninette | | 2008 | |
| HN5276 | | | | |
| HN5277 | | | | |
| HN5278 | | | | |
| HN5279 | | | | |
| HN5280 | | | | |
| HN5281 | Family | Kerry Jameson | 2008 | |
| HN5282 | | | | |
| HN5283 | Cherised Moment | Kerry Jameson | 2008 | |
| HN5284 | Mummy's Girl | Kerry Jameson | 2008 | |
| HN5285 | Daddy's Boy | Kerry Jameson | 2008 | |
| HN5286 | | | | |
| HN5287 | | | | |
| HN5288 | Brother and Sister | Kerry Jameson | 2008 | |
| HN5289 | Mum and Dad | Kerry Jameson | 2008 | |
| HN5290 | Daddy's Pride and Joy | Kerry Jameson | 2008 | |
| HN5291 | Mummy's Little Angel | Kerry Jameson | 2008 | |
| HN5292 | Lasting Memories | Kerry Jameson | 2008 | |
| HN5293 | | | | |
| HN5294 | | | | |
| HN5295 | | | | |
| HN5296 | Sisters | Kerry Jameson | 2008 | |
| HN5297 | Brothers | Kerry Jameson | 2008 | |
| HN5298 | Sleepyheads | Kerry Jameson | 2008 | |
| HN5299 | Playtime | Kerry Jameson | 2008 | |

== HN5300 to 5399 ==
| # | Title | Designer(s) | From | To |
|---|---|---|---|---|
| HN5300 | Big Hug | Kerry Jameson | 2008 | |
| HN5301 | Best of Friends | Kerry Jameson | 2008 | |
| HN5302 | Welsh Beauty | | | |
| HN5303 | | | | |
| HN5304 | Special Friends | Kerry Jameson | 2008 | |
| HN5305 | Franceschina | Valarie Annand | 2008 | |
| HN5306 | Harlequina | Valarie Annand | 2008 | |
| HN5307 | Jongleur | Valarie Annand | 2008 | |
| HN5308 | Trickster | Valarie Annand | 2008 | |
| HN5309 | Lady Anne Marie | | | |
| HN5310 | | | | |
| HN5311 | | | | |
| HN5312 | Santa's Workshop | | 2008 | 2008 |
| HN5313 | | | | |
| HN5314 | Winter | | | |
| HN5315 | Laura | | 2008 | 2008 |
| HN5316 | Sarah | | 2008 | 2009 |
| HN5317 | Forever Young | | 2008 | 2009 |
| HN5318 | Helena | | 2009 | |
| HN5319 | Rebecca | | 2008 | |
| HN5320 | Christine | Neil Faulkner | | |
| HN5321 | Millenium Celebration | | | |
| HN5322 | Summer | | | |
| HN5323 | Pretty Ladies - Autumn | | | |
| HN5324 | Charlotte | Nada M. Pedley | 2009 | 2009 |
| HN5325 | Gabrielle | John Bromley | 2009 | 2009 |
| HN5326 | | | | |
| HN5327 | Jessica | Nada M. Pedley | 2010 | |
| HN5328 | | | | |
| HN5329 | | | | |
| HN5330 | | | | |
| HN5331 | Jane | Neil Falukner | 2010 | |
| HN5332 | Anne | Neil Faulkkner | 2010 | |
| HN5333 | | | | |
| HN5334 | Diana | | 2009 | |
| HN5335 | With Love | | 2009 | |
| HN5336 | My Darling | | 2009 | |
| HN5337 | Thank You | | 2009 | |
| HN5338 | Aquarius | Neil Faulkner | 2009 | |
| HN5339 | Cancer | Neil Faulkner | 2009 | |
| HN5340 | Leo | Neil Faulkner | 2009 | |
| HN5341 | Capricorn | Neil Faulkner | 2009 | |
| HN5342 | Sagittarius | Neil Faulkner | 2009 | |
| HN5343 | Libra | Neil Faulkner | 2009 | |
| HN5344 | Gemini | Neil Faulkner | 2009 | |
| HN5345 | Virgo | Neil Faulkner | 2009 | |
| HN5346 | Aries | Neil Faulkner | 2009 | |
| HN5347 | Pisces | Neil Faulkner | 2009 | |
| HN5348 | Scorpio | Neil Faulkner | 2009 | |
| HN5349 | Taurus | Neil Faulkner | 2009 | |
| HN5350 | Christmas Day | | 2009 | |
| HN5351 | | | | |
| HN5352 | | | | |
| HN5353 | | | | |
| HN5354 | Yours Forever Love and Affection | | | |
| HN5355 | | | | |
| HN5356 | | | | |
| HN5357 | | | | |
| HN5358 | | | | |
| HN5359 | Christmas Morning | | 2009 | |
| HN5360 | Brotherly Love | | | |
| HN5361 | Forever Sisters | | | |
| HN5362 | Beefeater | Tim Potts | 2009 | |
| HN5363 | Guardsman | Tim Potts | 2009 | |
| HN5364 | Cavalryman | Tim Potts | 2009 | |
| HN5365 | British Policeman | Tim Potts | 2009 | |
| HN5366 | Lady Spinning | | | |
| HN5367 | Classic Father Christmas | | 2010 | |
| HN5368 | | | | |
| HN5369 | My First Bunnykens | Neil Faulkner | | |
| HN5370 | Samurai Warrior | Shane Ridge | 2009 | 2009 |
| HN5371 | Knight of the Crusades | Shane Ridge | 2009 | |
| HN5372 | Jack Point | Shane Ridge | 2009 | |
| HN5373 | Alexandra | Neil Faulkner | 2009 | |
| HN5374 | Julie | Neil Faulkner | 2009 | |
| HN5375 | | | | |
| HN5376 | Sophie | | 2010 | 2010 |
| HN5377 | Happy Birthday | | 2010 | 2010 |
| HN5378 | | | | |
| HN5379 | Christmas Day | | 2010 | |
| HN5380 | Especially For You | Neil Faulkner | 2010 | 2010 |
| HN5381 | Abigail | John Bromley | 2010 | 2010 |
| HN5382 | Charlotte | Neil Faulkner | 2010 | |
| HN53583 | Brooke (Water) | Neil Faulkner | 2009 | 2009 |
| HN5384 | | | | |
| HN5385 | Marion | Nada M. Pedley | 2009 | 2009 |
| HN5386 | Alexis | Nada M. Pedley | 2010 | |
| HN5387 | | | | |
| HN5388 | Waiting For Santa | | 2009 | 2009 |
| HN5389 | Loving You | | | |
| HN5390 | Hayley | Nada M. Pedley | 2010 | 2010 |
| HN5391 | | | | |
| HN5392 | | | | |
| HN5393 | | | | |
| HN5394 | | | | |
| HN5395 | | | | |
| HN5396 | Your Special Day | | 2010 | |
| HN5397 | Emily | Nada M. Pedley | 2010 | |
| HN5398 | | | | |
| HN5399 | | | | |

== HN5400 to 5499 ==
| # | Title | Designer(s) | From | To |
|---|---|---|---|---|
| HN5401 | Belle | Neil Faulkner | 2010 | 2010 |
| HN5402 | Serenity | Neil Faulkner | 2010 | 2010 |
| HN5403 | | | | |
| HN5404 | | | | |
| HN5405 | Carolyn | | 2010 | |
| HN5406 | Denise | | 2010 | |
| HN5407 | Pamela | | 2010 | |
| HN5408 | On the Seventh Day of Christmas | | 2010 | |
| HN5409 | On the Eighth Day of Christmas | | 2010 | |
| HN5410 | On the Ninth Day of Christmas | | 2010 | |
| HN5411 | Christmas Day | | 2010 | |
| HN5412 | Caroline | | 2010 | |
| HN5413 | Sandra | | 2010 | |
| HN5414 | Lady Charmain | | 2010 | |
| HN5415 | Alice | | 2010 | |
| HN5416 | Tender Moment | Tim Potts | 2010 | |
| HN5417 | Sunday at the Park | Neil Faulkner | 2010 | |
| HN5418 | | | | |
| HN5419 | Ellen | Neil Faulkner | | |
| HN5420 | With All My Love | | 2010 | |
| HN5421 | Heartfelt Wishes | | 2010 | |
| HN5422 | For Your Special Day | | 2010 | |
| HN5423 | Celebrating You | | 2010 | |
| HN5424 | | | | |
| HN5425 | Evelyn | Nada M. Pedley | 2010 | |
| HN5426 | Emma | Neil Faulkner | 2011 | |
| HN5427 | Erin | Neil Faulkner | 2010 | |
| HN5428 | Happy Birthday | Neil Faulkner | 2011 | |
| HN5429 | Christmas Wish | | 2011 | |
| HN5430 | A Loving Touch | Neil Faulkner | 2010 | |
| HN5431 | A Mother's Love | Neil Faulkner | 2011 | |
| HN5432 | Isabella | John Bromley | 2011 | |
| HN5433 | Isabella (Australian Exclusive) | Commissioned for TVSN Australia | 2010 | |
| HN5434 | Lily | Neil Faulkner | 2011 | |
| HN5435 | Winter Romance | | 2011 | |
| HN5436 | Father Christmas | Neil Faulkner | 2011 | |
| HN5437 | Scarlett | Neil Faulkner | 2010 | |
| HN5438 | Jessica | Neil Faulkner | 2010 | |
| HN5439 | Sara | Neil Faulkner | 2010 | |
| HN5440 | Amelia | Neil Faulkner | 2010 | |
| HN5441 | Ella | Neil Faulkner | 2010 | |
| HN5442 | Nancy | Neil Faulkner | 2010 | |
| HN5443 | The Tango | Neil Faulkner | 2010 | |
| HN5444 | Slow Waltz | Neil Faulkner | 2010 | |
| HN5445 | The Fox Trot | Neil Faulkner | 2010 | |
| HN5446 | Jive | Neil Faulkner | 2010 | |
| HN5447 | Cha Cha | Neil Faulkner | 2010 | |
| HN5448 | The Quick Step | Neil Faulkner | 2010 | |
| HN5449 | Especially For You | | 2010 | |
| HN5450 | To Someone Special | | 2010 | |
| HN5451 | With Love | | 2010 | |
| HN5452 | A Gift For You | | 2010 | |
| HN5453 | Together Forever | | 2010 | |
| HN5454 | Love Of My Life | | 2010 | |
| HN5455 | Best Wishes | | 2010 | |
| HN5456 | Special Celebration | | 2010 | |
| HN5457 | Forever Yours | | 2010 | |
| HN5458 | For My Mum | | 2010 | |
| HN5459 | To Show I Care | | 2010 | |
| HN5460 | True Romance | | 2010 | |
| HN5461 | Lady Telopea | | 2010 | |
| HN5462 | Lady Acacia | | 2010 | |
| HN5463 | Lady Dendrobium | | 2010 | |
| HN5464 | Summer Ball | | 2012 | |
| HN5465 | Autumn Ball | | 2012 | |
| HN5466 | Winter Ball | | 2012 | |
| HN5467 | Spring Ball | | 2012 | |
| HN5468 | Santa Makes His List | | 2010 | |
| HN5469 | Santa's World Map | | 2010 | |
| HN5470 | Season's Greetings | | 2010 | |
| HN5471 | A Gift For You | | 2011 | |
| HN5472 | Taylor | | 2011 | |
| HN5473 | Madison | | 2011 | |
| HN5474 | First Love | | 2010 | |
| HN5475 | Best Friends | | 2010 | |
| HN5476 | Mother and Baby | | 2010 | |
| HN5477 | Sweetheart | A. Malinowski | 2000 | 2003 |
| HN5478 | Dressing Up | | 2010 | |
| HN5479 | Daddy's Girl | | 2010 | |
| HN5480 | Rascals | | 2010 | |
| HN5481 | Piggy Back | | 2010 | |
| HN5482 | Inaugural Ball | | 2010 | |
| HN5483 | Jasmine | | | |
| HN5484 | Alicia | | | |
| HN5485 | | | | |
| HN5486 | Lady Epacris | | 2011 | |
| HN5487 | Lady Wahlenberg | | 2011 | |
| HN5488 | Lady Swainsona | | 2011 | |
| HN5489 | Precious Gift | | | |
| HN5490 | | | | |
| HN5491 | Thoughts of You | | | |
| HN5492 | With Love | | | |
| HN5493 | Best Wishes | | | |
| HN5494 | | | | |
| HN5495 | | | | |
| HN5496 | Elizabeth | Nada M. Pedley | 2011 | |
| HN5497 | Ava | | | |
| HN5498 | Afternoon Tea | Neil Faulkner | 2011 | |
| HN5499 | | | | |

== HN5500 to 5599 ==
| # | Title | Designer(s) | From | To |
|---|---|---|---|---|
| HN5500 | January-Snowdrop | | 2011 | |
| HN5501 | February-Violet | | 2011 | |
| HN5502 | March-Jonquil | | 2011 | |
| HN5503 | April-Daisy | | 2011 | |
| HN5504 | May-Peony | | 2011 | |
| HN5505 | June-Rose | | 2011 | |
| HN5506 | July-Larkspur | | 2011 | |
| HN5507 | August-Poppy | | 2011 | |
| HN5508 | September-Aster | | 2011 | |
| HN5509 | October-Hydrangea | | 2011 | |
| HN5510 | November-Chrysanthemum | | 2011 | |
| HN5511 | December-Mistletoe | | 2011 | |
| HN5512 | Megan | | 2011 | |
| HN5513 | Madeline | | 2011 | |
| HN5514 | Lauren | | 2011 | |
| HN5515 | Amy | | 2011 | |
| HN5516 | Rebecca | | 2011 | |
| HN5517 | Nicole | | 2011 | |
| HN5518 | On the Tenth Day of Christmas | | 2011 | |
| HN5519 | On the Eleventh Day of Christmas | | 2011 | |
| HN5520 | On the Twelfth Day of Christmas | | 2011 | |
| HN5521 | Winters Day | | 2012 | |
| HN5522 | Christmas Night | | 2012 | |
| HN5523 | Christmas Day | | 2012 | |
| HN5524 | Christmas Gifts | | 2012 | |
| HN5525 | Alyssa | Neil Faulkner | 2012 | |
| HN5526 | Rachel | Neil Faulkner | 2012 | |
| HN5527 | Kate | Neil Faulkner | 2012 | |
| HN5528 | Lorraine | Neil Faulkner | 2012 | |
| HN5529 | Danielle | Neil Faulkner | 2012 | |
| HN5530 | Gillian | Neil Faulkner | 2012 | |
| HN5531 | Holiday Barbie | | 2011 | |
| HN5532 | Birthday Wishes Barbie | | 2011 | |
| HN5533 | Lady Anigozanthos | | 2012 | |
| HN5534 | Lady Evenlyptus | | 2012 | |
| HN5535 | Lady Gossypium | | 2012 | |
| HN5536 | Father Christmas Classic | Neil Faulkner | 2011 | |
| HN5537 | Ashley | Nada M. Pedley | 2012 | |
| HN5538 | Time to Celebrate | | 2012 | |
| HN5539 | | | | |
| HN5540 | Georgia | Neil Faulkner | 2012 | |
| HN5541 | Mia | Neil Faulkner | 2012 | |
| HN5542 | Happy Birthday | | 2012 | |
| HN5543 | Victoria | | 2012 | |
| HN5544 | A Tender Love | | 2012 | |
| HN5545 | Natalie | | 2012 | |
| HN5546 | A Winter's Dream | | 2012 | |
| HN5547 | A Christmas Gift | | 2012 | |
| HN5548 | Christmas Joy | Neil Faulkner | 2012 | |
| HN5549 | Santa's Toy Testing | Neil Faulkner | 2011 | |
| HN5550 | Santa Takes A Break | | 2012 | |
| HN5551 | Santa's Toy Testing | | 2011 | |
| HN5552 | Sweet Devotion | | 2012 | |
| HN5553 | A Perfect Gift | | 2012 | |
| HN5554 | A Tender Moment | | 2012 | |
| HN5555 | My Darling | | 2012 | |
| HN5556 | Loving You | | 2012 | |
| HN5557 | Sweet Serenade | | 2012 | |
| HN5558 | Margaret | Nada M. Pedley | 2012 | |
| HN5559 | Catherine 'Royal Wedding Day' | Neil Welch | 2011 | |
| HN5560 | Gabriella | | | |
| HN5561 | Bethany | | | |
| HN5562 | Joanne | | | |
| HN5563 | Lucy | | | |
| HN5564 | Alison | | | |
| HN5565 | Claire | | | |
| HN5566 | Rose | | 2012 | |
| HN5567 | Russian Ballerina | | 2012 | |
| HN5568 | Chinese Fan Dance | | 2012 | |
| HN5569 | Irish Celtic Dance | | 2012 | |
| HN5570 | Spanish Flamingo | | 2012 | |
| HN5571 | French Can-Can | | 2012 | |
| HN5572 | Scottish Highland Fling | | 2012 | |
| HN5573 | Prince William 'Royal Wedding Day' | | 2012 | |
| HN5574 | Celebration | | 2012 | |
| HN5575 | Congratulations | | 2012 | |
| HN5576 | Especially For You | | 2012 | |
| HN5577 | Forever Young | | 2012 | |
| HN5578 | Good Friend | | 2012 | |
| HN5579 | Happy Memories | | 2012 | |
| HN5580 | Dressing for the Ball | | | |
| HN5581 | Peony and Violet-Getting Ready for the Ball | Neil Faulkner | 2012 | |
| HN5582 | Queen Elizabeth II Diamond Jubilee | Tim Potts | 2012 | |
| HN5583 | Holiday Greetings | Neil Faulkner | 2013 | |
| HN5584 | Christmas Time | Neil Faulkner | | |
| HN5585 | Letters to Santa | Neil Faulkner | 2013 | |
| HN5586 | Catherine | Neil Welch | 2013 | |
| HN5587 | Happy Birthday | Neil Welch | 2013 | |
| HN5588 | Laura | Neil Welch | 2013 | |
| HN5589 | Togetherness | Neil Faulkner | 2012 | |
| HN5590 | Donna | Neil Faulkner | 2012 | |
| HN5591 | Kate | Neil Welch | 2013 | |
| HN5592 | Gloria | | 2012 | |
| HN5593 | Jean | | 2012 | |
| HN5594 | Judy | | 2012 | |
| HN5595 | Nancy | | 2012 | |
| HN5596 | Penny | | 2012 | |
| HN5597 | Charlie | | 2012 | |
| HN5598 | Santa's World Travels | Diane Kolar | 2012 | |
| HN5599 | Bluebell | Nada M. Pedley | 2012 | |

== HN5600 to 5699 ==
| # | Title | Designer(s) | From | To |
|---|---|---|---|---|
| HN5600 | Lisa | Neil Faulkner | 2012 | |
| HN5601 | Amanda | Neil Faulkner | 2012 | |
| HN5602 | Kim | Neil Faulkner | 2012 | |
| HN5603 | Angela | Neil Faulkner | 2012 | |
| HN5604 | Marie | Neil Faulkner | 2012 | |
| HN5605 | Linda | Neil Faulkner | 2012 | |
| HN5606 | Deck The Halls | Neil Faulkner | 2012 | |
| HN5607 | Silver Bells | Neil Faulkner | 2012 | |
| HN5608 | White Christmas | Neil Faulkner | 2012 | |
| HN5609 | Barbie Collector Edition | | 2012 | |
| HN5610 | Barbie Princess Charm School | | 2012 | |
| HN5611 | Shannon | Nada M. Pedley | 2012 | |
| HN5612 | Molly | Nada M. Pedley | 2012 | |
| HN5613 | Winter's Day | | 2012 | |
| HN5614 | Christmas Night | | 2012 | |
| HN5615 | Christmas Day | | 2012 | |
| HN5616 | Christmas Gifts | | 2012 | |
| HN5617 | | | | |
| HN5618 | Holly | | 2012 | |
| HN5619 | Karen | | 2013 | |
| HN5620 | Michelle | | 2013 | |
| HN5621 | Christine | | 2013 | |
| HN5622 | Kathy | | 2013 | |
| HN5623 | Tracy | Neil Faulkner | 2013 | |
| HN5624 | Sharon | Neil Faulkner | 2013 | |
| HN5625 | Laurie | Neil Faulkner | 2013 | |
| HN5626 | January-Garnet | | 2013 | |
| HN5627 | February-Amethyst | | 2013 | |
| HN5628 | March-Aquamarine | | 2013 | |
| HN5629 | April-Diamond | | 2013 | |
| HN5630 | May-Emerald | | 2013 | |
| HN5631 | June-Pearl | | 2013 | |
| HN5632 | July-Ruby | | 2013 | |
| HN5633 | August-Peridot | | 2013 | |
| HN5634 | September-Sapphire | | 2013 | |
| HN5635 | October-Opal | | 2013 | |
| HN5636 | November-Topaz | | 2013 | |
| HN5637 | December-Turquoise | | 2013 | |
| HN5638 | | | | |
| HN5639 | Winter Wonderland | Neil Faulkner | 2013 | |
| HN5640 | Joy To The World | Neil Faulkner | 2013 | |
| HN5641 | We Wish You A Merry Christmas | Neil Faulkner | 2013 | |
| HN5642 | American Cabaret | | 2013 | |
| HN5643 | Mexican Hat Dance | | 2013 | |
| HN5644 | Italian Folk Dance | | 2013 | |
| HN5645 | Thai Dance | | 2013 | |
| HN5646 | Wedding Day | | 2013 | |
| HN5647 | Forever | | 2013 | |
| HN5648 | Darling | | 2013 | |
| HN5649 | Jester | | 2013 | |
| HN5650 | Sunshine Girl | | 2013 | |
| HN5651 | Princess Badoura | | 2013 | |
| HN5652 | The Poka | | 2013 | |
| HN5653 | Mantilla | | 2013 | |
| HN5654 | Columbine | | 2013 | |
| HN5655 | Isadora | | 2013 | |
| HN5656 | Henry V At Agincourt | | 2013 | |
| HN5657 | Knight Of The Crusade | | 2013 | |
| HN5658 | A Christmas Kiss | Diane Kolar | 2013 | |
| HN5659 | Anna | Neil Faulkner | 2014 | |
| HN5660 | | | | |
| HN5661 | | | | |
| HN5662 | | | | |
| HN5663 | Dawn | | 2014 | |
| HN5664 | Julia | | 2014 | |
| HN5665 | Patricia | | 2014 | |
| HN5666 | Melissa | | 2014 | |
| HN5667 | Rosemary | | 2014 | |
| HN5668 | Sarah | | 2014 | |
| HN5669 | Kelly | | 2014 | |
| HN5670 | Tiffany | | 2014 | |
| HN5671 | Elizabeth | | 2014 | |
| HN5672 | Happy Birthday | | 2014 | |
| HN5673 | Tallulah | Neil Faulkner | 2014 | |
| HN5674 | Festive Skating | | 2014 | |
| HN5675 | Skating Season | | 2014 | |
| HN5676 | Jenny | | 2014 | |
| HN5677 | Liz | | 2014 | |
| HN5678 | Emma | | 2014 | |
| HN5679 | Mary | | 2014 | |
| HN5680 | Daisy | | 2014 | |
| HN5681 | Georgiana | | 2014 | |
| HN5682 | Prom Night | Neil Faulkner | 2015 | |
| HN5683 | Always Friends | Neil Faulkner | 2015 | |
| HN5684 | Bundle Of Joy | Neil Faulkner | 2015 | |
| HN5685 | Happy Anniversary | Neil Faulkner | 2015 | |
| HN5686 | Special Anniversary | Neil Faulkner | 2015 | |
| HN5687 | Happy Days | Neil Faulkner | 2015 | |
| HN5688 | A Mother's Joy | Neil Faulkner | 2014 | |
| HN5689 | Santa's Sleigh | | 2014 | |
| HN5690 | HRH Mary, Crown Princess of Denmark | | 2014 | |
| HN5691 | Enduring Love | John Bromley | 2013 | |
| HN5692 | Day At The Races | Nada M. Pedley | 2014 | |
| HN5693 | Heather | | 2014 | |
| HN5694 | Carol | | 2014 | |
| HN5695 | Anna | | 2014 | |
| HN5696 | Fiona | | 2014 | |
| HN5697 | Stephanie | | 2014 | |
| HN5698 | Janice | | 2014 | |
| HN5699 | Jingle Bells | | 2014 | |

== HN5700 to 5799 ==
| # | Title | Designer(s) | From | To |
|---|---|---|---|---|
| HN5700 | Silent Night | | 2014 | |
| HN5701 | Mistletoe and Wine | | 2014 | |
| HN5702 | | | | |
| HN5703 | | | | |
| HN5704 | Queen Elizabeth I | | 2014 | |
| HN5705 | Queen Victoria | | 2014 | |
| HN5706 | Queen Elizabeth II | | 2014 | |
| HN5707 | Santa With Reindeer | | 2014 | |
| HN5708 | Santa With Sack | | 2014 | |
| HN5709 | Santa With Sleigh | | 2014 | |
| HN5710 | Angel Blessed | | 2014 | |
| HN5711 | Angel Hallelujah | | 2014 | |
| HN5712 | Angel Fanfare | | 2014 | |
| HN5713 | Silver Bells | | 2014 | |
| HN5714 | White Christmas | | 2014 | |
| HN5715 | Deck The Halls | | 2014 | |
| HN5716 | Royal Baby | | 2014 | |
| HN5717 | | | | |
| HN5718 | Close To My Heart | Neil Faulkner | 2014 | |
| HN5719 | Andrea | Neil Faulkner | 2014 | |
| HN5720 | Jaqueline | | 2014 | |
| HN5721 | Paula | | 2014 | |
| HN5722 | Cherly | | 2014 | |
| HN5723 | Diane | Neil Faulkner | 2014 | |
| HN5724 | Wendy | | 2014 | |
| HN5725 | Eleanor | | 2014 | |
| HN5726 | Kimberly | Neil Faulkner | 2014 | |
| HN5727 | Lydia | | 2014 | |
| HN5728 | Mother's Day Time Together | Neil Faulkner | 2014 | |
| HN5729 | Happy Birthday | | 2014 | |
| HN5730 | Ellie | | 2014 | |
| HN5731 | Christmas Morning | | 2015 | 2015 |
| HN5732 | | | | |
| HN5733 | A Gift for Santa | | | |
| HN5734 | Sandra | | 2014 | |
| HN5735 | Tina | | 2014 | |
| HN5736 | Angel Charm | | 2014 | |
| HN5737 | Keys Charm | | 2014 | |
| HN5738 | Four Leaf Clover Charm | | 2014 | |
| HN5739 | Heart Charm | | 2014 | |
| HN5740 | Horse Shoe Charm | | 2014 | |
| HN5741 | Star Charm | | 2014 | |
| HN5742 | Mr. Doulton | | 2015 | |
| HN5743 | Lady Doulton | | 2015 | |
| HN5744 | Midsummer Celebration | | 2015 | |
| HN5745 | Duke of Wellington | | 2015 | |
| HN5746 | King George III | | 2015 | |
| HN5747 | Lion's Mound | | 2015 | |
| HN5748 | | | | |
| HN5749 | | | | |
| HN5750 | Simpson and his Donkey | | 2014 | |
| HN5751 | Isabella | | 2015 | |
| HN5752 | Jodie | | 2015 | |
| HN5753 | Olivia | | 2015 | |
| HN5754 | | | | |
| HN5755 | | | | |
| HN5756 | | | | |
| HN5757 | The First Noel | | 2015 | |
| HN5758 | Hallelujah Chorus | | 2015 | |
| HN5759 | O Holy Night | | 2015 | |
| HN5760 | Ruby | | 2015 | |
| HN5761 | Evening Elegance | | 2015 | |
| HN5762 | Summer Dance | | 2015 | |
| HN5763 | Rose Ball | | 2015 | |
| HN5764 | Romantic Stroll | | 2015 | |
| HN5765 | With Thanks | | 2015 | |
| HN5766 | | | | |
| HN5767 | | | | |
| HN5768 | Sapphire | Neil Faulkner | 2015 | 2015 |
| HN5769 | | | | |
| HN5770 | | | | |
| HN5771 | | | | |
| HN5772 | | | | |
| HN5773 | | | | |
| HN5774 | | | | |
| HN5775 | | | | |
| HN5776 | | | | |
| HN5777 | Frances | Neil Faulkner | 2015 | |
| HN5778 | Elise | | | |
| HN5779 | Imogen | | 2014 | |
| HN5780 | | | | |
| HN5781 | | | | |
| HN5782 | | | | |
| HN5783 | | | | |
| HN5784 | Day at London's Regent Park | | | |
| HN5785 | | | | |
| HN5786 | | | | |
| HN5787 | | | | |
| HN5788 | | | | |
| HN5789 | Family Outing | Neil Faulkner | 2015 | |
| HN5790 | Rhythm and Dance Ballerina | | | |
| HN5791 | Rhythm and Dance Jazz Dancer | | | |
| HN5792 | Rhythm and Dance Tap Dancer | | | |
| HN5793 | Rhythm and Dance Gymnast | | | |
| HN5794 | | | | |
| HN5795 | Princess Charlotte | | 2015 | |
| HN5796 | | | | |
| HN5797 | | | | |
| HN5798 | | | | |
| HN5799 | | | | |

== See also ==
- List of Bunnykins figurines
- Royal Doulton
