= 1888–89 Derby County F.C. season =

Derby County
1888–89 season
- Football League: 10th (16 Points)
- FA Cup: Second Round
- Top goalscorer: Alex Higgins (12)
Home colours

The 1888–89 season was Derby County's first season in the Football League which had just been founded. Because of this they became one of the founder members of the Football League. They finished in 10th position with 16 points.

== Final league table ==
Pos	Team	Pld	W	D	L	GF	GA	GAv	Pts	Qualification
8	Everton	22	9	2	11	35	47	0.745	20	
9	Burnley	22	7	3	12	42	62	0.677	17	Re-elected
10	Derby County	22	7	2	13	41	61	0.672	16	Re-elected
11	Notts County	22	5	2	15	40	73	0.548	12	Re-elected
12	Stoke	22	4	4	14	26	51	0.510	12	Re-elected

Source: World Football
Rules for classification: 1) Points; 2) Goal average; 3) Goals scored

== Results ==
Derby County's score comes first

=== Legend ===
Win	Draw	Loss

=== Football League ===
Match	Date	Opponent	Venue	Result	Attendance	Scorers
1	8 September 1888	Bolton Wanderers	A	6–3	3,000	L Plackett (2), Cooper (2), Bakwell (2)
2	15 September 1888	West Bromwich Albion	H	1–2	3,700	H Plackett
3	22 September 1888	Accrington	H	1–1	3,000	Higgins
4	29 September 1888	Preston North End	H	2–3	6,000	H Plackett, Wright
5	6 October 1888	West Bromwich Albion	A	0–5	5,500	
6	13 October 1888	Accrington	A	2–6	3,000	Higgins, L Plackett
7	20 October 1888	Everton	H	2–4	2,000	Chatterton, Bakwell
8	27 October 1888	Everton	A	2–6	5,000	L Plackett, Needham
9	3 November 1888	Wolverhampton Wanderers	A	1–4	6,000	Lees
10	24 November 1888	Blackburn Rovers	H	0–2	3,000	
11	8 December 1888	Preston North End	A	0–5	4,000	
12	22 December 1888	Notts County	H	3–2	2,500	Bakwell, Higgins, Unknown
13	26 December 1888	Bolton Wanderers	H	2–3	3,500	Higgins (2)
14	29 December 1888	Aston Villa	A	2–4	4,000	Bakwell, Spilsbury
15	12 January 1889	Wolverhampton Wanderers	H	3–0	2,000	Cooper, L Plackett, Higgins
16	19 January 1889	Burnley	A	0–1	3,000	
17	26 January 1889	Stoke	H	2–1	2,500	L Plackett, Cooper
18	2 March 1889	Burnley	H	1–0	3,000	Cooper
19	9 March 1889	Aston Villa	H	5–2	3,000	Higgins (4), Cooper
20	16 March 1889	Notts County	A	5–3	5,000	Bakwell, Higgins, Cooper (2), Lees
21	6 April 1889	Stoke	A	1–1	4,000	L Plackett
22	15 April 1889	Blackburn Rovers	A	0–3	4,000	

=== FA Cup ===
Round	Date	Opponent	Venue	Result	Attendance	Scorers
R1	2 February 1889	Derby Junction	H	1–0	4,000	Higgins
R2	16 February 1889	Aston Villa	A	3–5	2,000	Cooper (2), L Plackett

== Appearances ==
Pos.	Name	League		FA Cup		Total	
Pos.	Name	Apps	Goals	Apps	Goals	Apps	Goals
FW	(England) George Bakewell	16	6	2	0	18	6
HB	(England) E.W. Bellhouse	2	0	0	0	2	0
GK	(England) Harold Bestwick	1	0	0	0	1	0
GK	(England) Enos Bromage	2	0	0	0	2	0
FW	(England) William Chatterton	5	1	0	0	5	1
HB	(England) G. Clifton	1	0	0	0	1	0
FW	(England) Lewis Cooper	15	8	2	2	17	10
FB	(Scotland) Archibald Ferguson	16	0	1	0	17	0
FB	(England) H. Harbour	1	0	0	0	1	0
FB	(England) Ernest Hickinbottom	1	0	0	0	1	0
FW	(Scotland) Alex Higgins	21	11	2	1	22	12
FB	(England) William Hopewell	5	0	0	0	5	0
FB	(England) Arthur Latham	20	0	2	0	22	0
FW	(England) John Lees	5	2	0	0	5	2
GK	(England) Joseph Marshall	16	0	0	0	16	0
HB	(England) Issac Monks	3	0	1	0	4	0
HB	(England) Haydn Morley	4	0	2	0	6	0
FW	(England) Thomas Needham	9	1	1	0	10	1
GK	(England) Ruben Pitman	3	0	2	0	5	0
FW	(England) Harry Plackett	16	2	0	0	16	2
FW	(England) Lawrence Plackett	22	7	2	1	24	8
FB	(England) Frank Roulstone	1	0	0	0	1	0
HB	(England) Walter Roulstone	21	0	2	0	23	0
HB	(England) J. Smith	10	0	0	0	10	0
FW	(England) Benjamin Spilsbury	1	1	1	0	2	1
HB	(England) Albert Williamson	19	0	2	0	21	0
HB	(England) Levi Wright	4	1	0	0	4	1

== See also ==
- 1888–89 in English football
- List of Derby County F.C. seasons
