= Bestwick =

Bestwick is a surname. Notable people with the surname include:

- Allen Bestwick (born 1961), American sportscaster currently working for ESPN
- Billy Bestwick (1875–1938), English cricketer
- Deborah Bestwick MBE (born 1970), British entrepreneur
- Dick Bestwick (1930–2018), American football coach
- Harold Bestwick, English footballer
- Jamie Bestwick (born 1971), British BMX rider
- Robert Bestwick (1899–1980), English cricketer
- Simon Bestwick (born 1974), English writer
- Wilbur Bestwick, the first Sergeant Major of the United States Marine Corps

== See also ==
- Beswick (disambiguation)
- Bewick (disambiguation)
- Estwick
