= Bewick =

Bewick may refer to:

== Places ==
- Bewick, East Riding of Yorkshire, a deserted village in Aldbrough parish, England
- Bewick, Northumberland, a civil parish in England
  - Old Bewick
- Bewick Island, Queensland, Australia
- Bardowick (Bewick in Low Saxon), a municipality in Lüneburg, Lower Saxony, Germany

== People ==
- Bewick (surname), includes a list of people with that name
- Bewick Bridge (1767–1833), English vicar and mathematical author

== Organisations ==
- Bewick, Moreing and Company - Consulting mining engineers and managers of mines, sometimes referred to as 'Bewick'

== See also ==
- Bewick's swan, Cygnus bewickii
- Bewick's wren, Thryomanes bewickii
- Berwick (disambiguation)
- Buick (disambiguation)
