= Selvey =

Selvey is a surname. Notable people with the surname include:

- Mike Selvey (born 1948), English cricketer
- Scotch Selvey (1863–1947), English footballer
- Troy Selvey (born 1980), American basketball player
- Walter Selvey (1866–1944), English footballer
- Warwick Selvey (1939–2018), Australian shot putter and discus thrower

== See also ==
- Frank Selvy (1932–2024), American basketball player
