= Benjamin Spilsbury =

English footballer (1864–1938)

Benjamin Ward Spilsbury (1 August 1864 – 15 August 1938) was an English international footballer.

== Early life ==
Spilsbury was born at Findern, Derbyshire, son of the Reverend Benjamin Ward.

Spilsbury was an all-round athlete at Rossall School and later Repton School, where he played football, cricket and athletics. At Repton he was school champion four times in long jump, and in 1882 he broke the school record.

He enrolled at Jesus College, Cambridge, playing football for Cambridge University from 1884 to 1887. In his last year at the university, he was also captain of the team.

== Career ==
Spilsbury made his debut for the international team against Ireland on 28 February 1885. Spilsbury played three games for England, and scored five goals.

His biggest game for England came in 1886, when he scored four of England's goals in a 6–1 win over Ireland.

=== Derby County ===
After representing Cambridge University and his country, he played games for Derby County from 1884 to 1889. He is best remembered for scoring the first recorded Derby goal in 1884. In total he played eight FA cup games, scoring seven FA cup goals. He also played one league game, scoring one goal.

Spilsbury played a major role in the FA Cup in the years before League football. Inside-right had proved a problem position for Derby County to fill and, by the end of the year, 1888, Derby County had already tried five different players at that position. The last had been Alexander Higgins, known as Sandy Higgins but as the visit to Aston Villa approached (29 December 1888), Higgins was not available, so Derby County called up Spilsbury to make his League debut.

Aston Villa dominated the first half and were 2–0 up by the halfway mark in the first-half. Spilsbury then scored what was described as a fine goal, to put Derby County back in contention. As the first-half came to an end, despite some "fine saves" by Derby County goalkeeper, Joseph Marshall, Aston Villa re-established their two-goal lead. The second half was more even. Villa dominated the early exchanges ad went 4–1 up. Derby County came back into the match and George Bakewell got a second goal for Derby County to make the final score look more respectable.

The match against Aston Villa was Spilsbury' only League match. His goal was his only League goal. Spilsbury played one more time for Derby County. He was selected to replace Thomas Needham for the FA Cup first round tie against non-League Derby Junction F.C. The match was played on 2 February 1889 and Derby County won 1–0. Derby County finished 10th in the Football League scoring 41 goals, and went out of the FA Cup in the second round.

== Life after sport ==
After his playing career was over, he moved to Canada, where he worked as an estate agent. He died at North Vancouver in August 1938 aged 74.

== England career ==
Cap	Opponent	Date	Place	Result	Goals	Club
1	Ireland	28 February 1885	Manchester	4–0	1	Cambridge University
2	Ireland	13 March 1886	Belfast	6–1	4	Cambridge University
3	Scotland	27 March 1886	Glasgow	1–1	0	Cambridge University
