= Buik =

Buik may refer to:

- David Buik (born 1944), British financier and financial reporter
- William Buik (1824–1903), Scottish-born Australian politician, mayor of Adelaide, South Australia
- Naoufal Fassih, also known as Buik, 21st century Dutch gangster of Moroccan origins

== See also ==
- Buick (disambiguation)
- Bewick (disambiguation)
