= Plackett =

Plackett is a surname. Notable people with the surname include:

- Robin Plackett (1920–2009), English statistician
- William H. Plackett (1937–2016), US Navy officer
- Lawrence Plackett (1869–1939), English footballer
- Harry Plackett (1871–1948), English footballer
- Syd Plackett (1896–1946), English footballer
- Zandra Plackett, a fictional character in the UK TV series Bad Girls
- Richard Plackett, investor and Welsh international bridge player
