= Roulstone =

Roulstone is a surname. Notable people with the surname include:

- Alexander Roulstone (1890–1965), British World War I flying ace
- Doug Roulstone (born 1950), United States Navy officer and politician
- Frank Roulstone (1862–1939), English footballer
- George Roulstone (1767–1804), founder of The Knoxville Gazette
- Walter Roulstone (1866–1953), English footballer
