= Haydn Morley =

English footballer

Personal information
- Full name: Haydn Arthur Morley
- Date of birth: 26 November 1860
- Place of birth: Derby, England
- Date of death: 15 May 1953 (aged 92)
- Height: 6 ft 1 in (1.85 m)
- Position: Defender

Senior career*
Years	Team	Apps	(Gls)
1882	Derby Town		
1884	Derby County		
1886	Notts County		
1888	Nottingham Forest	3	
1888	Notts County	2	(0)
1889	Derby County	4	(0)
1889	The Wednesday		
1890	Burton Swifts		
1891	Loughborough		
- * Club domestic league appearances and goals

Haydn Arthur Morley (26 November 1860 — 15 May 1953) was an English footballer who played in The Football League for Derby County and Notts County. Morley also played cricket for Derbyshire in the summer months.

In September 1888 Morley signed for Nottingham Forest, but, he did not stay there long. Within three months he was back at Notts County and making his Football League debut.

Morley played two League matches for Notts County and when he played his team scored two goals (out of 40) and conceded five out of 73 goals. The 40 goals was the joint third lowest tally by any League club that season. The 73 goals conceded was the worst by any League club in 1888–89. Notts County finished 11th and had to seek re-election.

As March 1889 arrived, Archibald Ferguson was unavailable so Morley switched back to left-back for the visit of Burnley. This was Morley's League debut for Derby County. The game was fiercely contested and both defences played well. Lewis Cooper got the crucial winning goal in the 70th minute to enable Derby County to win 1–0.

Morley kept his place for four League matches, even when in the fourth match at Stoke, when Archibald Ferguson returned to the team, Morley kept his left-back spot. However, he was left out, or injured, for the last game of the season at Blackburn Rovers. He played four League games for Derby County, all at left-back. He also played in both of Derby County' FA Cup ties, once at left-back and once at right-back, keeping one clean-sheet.

In 1890, Morley captained The Wednesday in the FA Cup Final. Wednesday lost the game to Blackburn Rovers 6-1.

His granddaughter was actress Josephine Tewson (1931-2022).
