= Beswick (surname) =

Beswick is a surname, possibly derived from the town of Beswick, East Riding of Yorkshire and/or from the ancient village of Beswick, Greater Manchester. The surname is common in the Manchester and Bolton area.

Notable people with the surname include:

- Allan Beswick, British statesman and broadcaster
- Allan Beswick (rugby union) (1870–1908), South African rugby union player
- Bill Beswick, English sports psychologist
- Bob Beswick (born 1984), Ireland international rugby league footballer
- Dave Beswick (1910–1991), English footballer
- Eddie Beswick (born 2005), Australian racing driver
- Edmund Beswick (1858–1911), English rugby union footballer
- Ewart Beswick (1897–1978), English footballer
- Frank Beswick, Baron Beswick (1911–1987), British politician
- Hannah Beswick (1688–1758), a.k.a. the 'Manchester Mummy'
- Harry Beswick (architect) (1856–1929), English architect
- Harry Beswick (politician) (1860–1934), New Zealand mayor
- Ivan Beswick (1936–2012), English footballer
- James Wright Beswick, founder of Beswick Pottery in Staffordshire, England
- Jim Beswick (born 1958), American baseball player
- John Beswick (politician) (born 1937), Australian politician
- Joseph Beswick (1831–1888), New Zealand politician
- Marc Beswick (born 1983), Canadian football player
- Martine Beswick (born 1941), English actress and model
- Miriam Beswick, Australian politician
- Sammy Beswick (1903–1966), English footballer
- Steve Beswick, drummer with the band Slipstream
- Tomás Beswick (1911–1980), Argentine sprinter
