= Bewick (surname) =

Family name

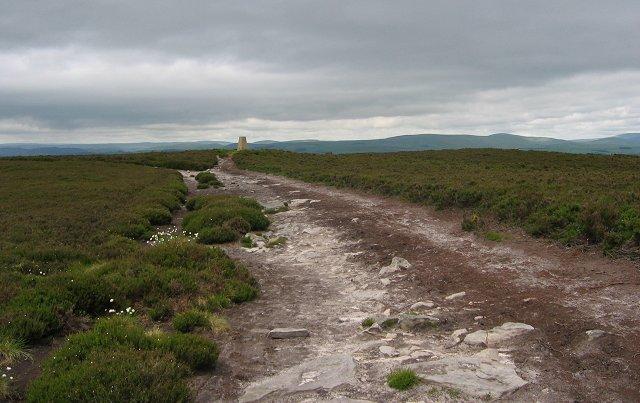
- A view of the countryside of Northumberland. The civil parish of Bewick is located in this county.
- Pronunciation: /ˈbjuːɪk/
- Language: English

Origin
- Meaning: Derived from two villages named Bewick.
- Region of origin: Northern England

Other names
- Related names: Buick, Buik, Bewicke and Bewike

The surname Bewick, alternately found as Buick, Buik, Bewicke, Bewike and Buicke, is ultimately of English origin, but later made its way to Scotland and came to prominence in the person of David Dunbar Buick, the Angus-born, Scottish American founder of the Buick Motor Company.

== Origins ==
Certain surnames, with Bewick being an example of this, are derived from the name of a small community. It is believed smaller towns and villages were taken as surnames by those families migrating from these rural communities to the larger cities, and the need for new arrivals to choose a defining surname.

There are two historic villages in England by the name Bewick, one is found in Yorkshire and the other is found in Northumberland. The Bewick of Northumberland is today a civil parish divided into the hamlet of New Bewick and the village of Old Bewick.

== Coat of arms ==
It is a common misconception that there is one coat of arms associated to everyone of a common surname, when, in fact, a coat of arms is property passed through direct lineage. This means that there are numerous families of Buick, perhaps under various spellings, that are related, but because they are not the direct descendants of a Buick that owned an armorial device do not have rights or claims to any arms themselves.

The coat of arms of the Bewickes of Newcastle upon Tyne, which are displayed on several plaques by various family members in the Cathedral Church of St. Nicholas, show a white shield with five red diamond-shaped lozenges, which have on each a white star, that run horizontal between three black bear's heads muzzled white and torn jaggedly at the neck, with two atop and one beneath the row of lozenges. The crest is a white goat's head jaggedly torn off at the neck that wears a collar of a mural crown. In heraldic terms, the coat of arms could be described as, Argent five lozenges conjoined in fess gules each charged with a mullet of the field between three bears' heads erased sable muzzled argent, and the crest as, A goat's head erased argent and gorged with a mural coronet gules.

The logo used on the Buick automobile is said to be derived from the ancient Buik coat of arms, as located in an 1851 edition of Burke's General Armory during the 1930s by General Motors researcher Ralph Pew. The coat of arms was described as "a red shield with a checkered silver and azure (blue) diagonal line running from the upper left corner to lower right, an antlered deer head with a jagged neckline in the upper right corner of the shield and a gold cross in the lower left corner. The cross had a hole in the center with the red of the shield showing through." A search today of Burke's General Armory shows no such entry for Buik, nor for Buick, so if the article existed in an 1851 edition, the editors have subsequently removed it.

== Notable persons ==
- Calverley Bewicke (1755–1815), Member of Parliament in the United Kingdom
- Darren Bewick (born 1967), Australian rules footballer
- Pauline Bewick (1935–2022), Irish artist
- Rohan Bewick (born 1989), Australian rules footballer
- Thomas Bewick (1753–1828), English wood engraver and ornithologist
- Thomas John Bewick (1821–1897), mining engineer, founder of Bewick, Moreling and Company
- William Bewick (1795–1866), English portrait painter
- David Dunbar Buick (1854–1929), Scottish-born American inventor, founder of the Buick Motor Company
