= Mary Bailey =

Mary Bailey may refer to:

== People ==
- Mary Bailey (aviator) (1890–1960), British aviator
- Mary Barbara Bailey (1910–2003), British Roman Catholic
- Mary Creighton Bailey (1913–2008), British classics scholar and educator
- Mary Johnson Bailey Lincoln (1844–1921), American teacher and cookbook author

== Characters ==
- Mary Bailey (Jericho), in the US post-apocalyptic action drama TV series Jericho, played by Clare Carey
- Mary Bailey (The Simpsons), in the US animated sitcom The Simpsons, voiced by Maggie Roswell and Tress MacNeille
- Mary Hatch Bailey, in the 1946 US Christmas supernatural drama film It's a Wonderful Life, played by Donna Reed (adult) and Jean Gale (child)
