= Beswick =

Beswick may refer to:

- Beswick (surname)
- Beswick, East Riding of Yorkshire
- Beswick, Manchester
- Beswick (ward), former Manchester City Council ward
- Beswick, Northern Territory, Australia, former name of Wugularr
  - Beswick Creek, Northern Territory, Australia, former name of Barunga

== See also ==
- Beswick Pottery in Staffordshire, England
- Beswick v Beswick, a 1967 landmark case in English contract law
- Bradford-with-Beswick, Manchester
