= List of Bunnykins figurines =

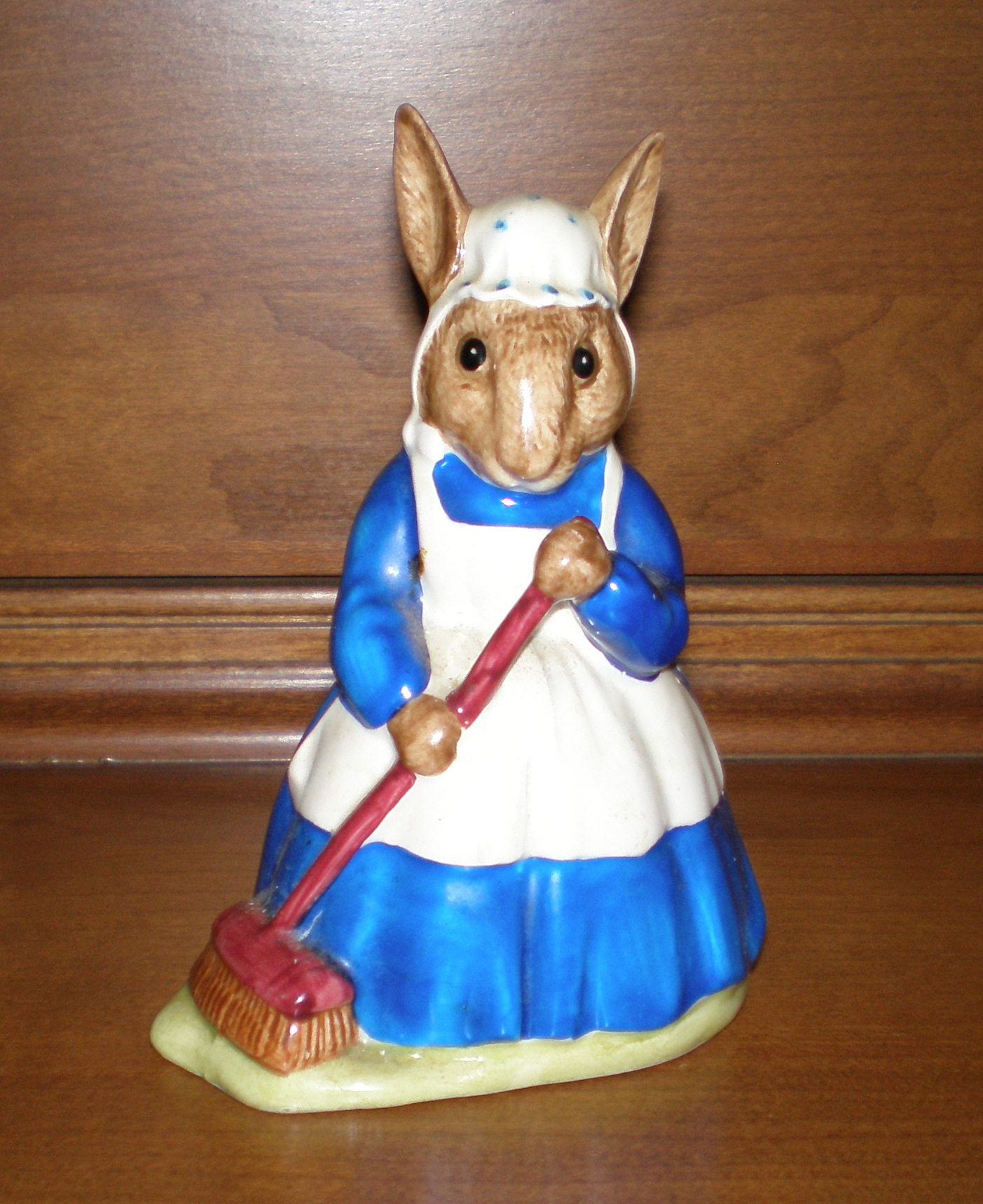
Royal Doulton Bunnykin figurine Mrs. Bunnykins "Clean Sweep", DB6, 1972-1991. From a design by Walter Hayward, modeled by Albert Hallam

This is a list of Royal Doulton Bunnykins figurines. Doulton & Co. (Royal Doulton) introduced the Bunnykins figurines in 1939 with six original Bunnykins figurines designed by Charles Noke based on illustrations by Sister Mary Barbara Bailey. Shortly thereafter, and prior to World War II, Doulton & Co. discontinued their manufacture. After Royal Doulton purchased the Beswick Pottery factory in 1969, Royal Doulton reintroduced the Bunnykins figurines. After the closure of Royal Doulton factory in England in 2005, Bunnykins figurines are produced in Asia. The Bunnykins figurines are in ascending order and include the name of the figurine, designer/modeler, date introduced, and the date discontinued.

== Original Bunnykins 1939 ==
- D6001 - Billy Bunnykins
- D6002 - Mary Bunnykins
- D6003 - Farmer Bunnykins
- D6004 - Mother Bunnykins
- D6024 - Freddy Bunnykins
- D6025 - Reggie Bunnykins

== Figurines DB1 to DB99 ==
Number	Title	Designed by/Modeled by	From	To
DB1	Family Photograph	Walter Hayward/Albert Hallam	1972	1988
DB2	Buntie Helping Mother	Walter Hayward/Albert Hallam	1972	1993
DB3	Billie Cooling Off	Walter Hayward/Albert Hallam	1972	1987
DB4	Sleigh Ride	Walter Hayward/Albert Hallam	1972	1997
DB5	Autumn Days	Walter Hayward/Albert Hallam	1972	1982
DB6	Clean Sweep	Walter Hayward/Albert Hallam	1972	1991
DB7	Daisie Springtime	Walter Hayward/Albert Hallam	1972	1983
DB8	Dollie Playtime	Walter Hayward/Albert Hallam	1972	1993
DB9	Storytime	Walter Hayward/Albert Hallam	1972	1997
DB10	Busy Needles	Walter Hayward/Albert Hallam	1973	1988
DB11	Rise and Shine	Walter Hayward/Albert Hallam	1973	1988
DB12	Tally Ho!	Walter Hayward/Albert Hallam	1973	1988
DB13	The Artist	Walter Hayward/Alan Maslankowski	1975	1982
DB14	Grandpa's Story	Walter Hayward/Alan Maslankowski	1975	1983
DB15	Sleepytime	Walter Hayward/Alan Maslankowski	1975	1993
DB16	Mr.Bunnybeat Strumming	Harry Sales/David Lyttleton	1982	1988
DB17	Santa Happy Christmas	Harry Sales/David Lyttleton	1981	1996
DB18	Mr.Bunnykins at the Easter Parade	Harry Sales/Graham Tongue	1982	1993
DB19	Mrs.Bunnykins at the Easter Parade	Harry Sales/David Lyttleton	1982	1996
DB20	Astro Rocket Man	Harry Sales/David Lyttleton	1983	1988
DB21	Happy Birthday	Harry Sales/Graham Tongue	1983	1997
DB22	Jogging	Harry Sales/David Lyttleton	1983	1989
DB23	Sousaphone (Red Oompah Band)	Harry Sales/David Lyttleton	1984	1990
DB24	Trumpeter (Red Oompah Band)	Harry Sales/David Lyttleton	1984	1990
DB25	Cymbals (Red Oompah Band)	Harry Sales/David Lyttleton	1984	1990
DB26A	Drummer (Red Oompah Band) Golden Jubilee Edition	Harry Sales/David Lyttleton	1984	1990
DB26B	Drummer (Red Oompah Band)	Harry Sales/David Lyttleton	1984	1990
DB27	Drum Major (Red Oompah Band)	Harry Sales/David Lyttleton	1984	1990
DB28A	Olympic (Blue and White)	Harry Sales/David Lyttleton	1984	1988
DB28B	Olympic Australia (Green and Gold) Golden Jubilee Edition	Harry Sales/David Lyttleton	1984	1984
DB29A	Touchdown (Blue and White) Golden Jubilee Edition	Harry Sales/David Lyttleton	1985	1988
DB29B	Touchdown Boston (Maroon and Gold)	Harry Sales/David Lyttleton	1985	1985
DB30	Knockout	Harry Sales/David Lyttleton	1984	1988
DB31	Downhill	Harry Sales/Graham Tongue	1985	1988
DB32	Bogey	Harry Sales/David Lyttleton	1984	1992
DB33A	Tally Ho! Music Box	Walter Hayward/Albert Hallam	1984	1993
DB33B	Tally Ho! (William) Music Box	Walter Hayward	1988	1991
DB34	Santa Music Box	Harry Sales/David Lyttleton	1984	1991
DB35	Astro Rocket Man Music Box	Harry Sales/David Lyttleton	1984	1989
DB36	Happy Birthday Music Box	Harry Sales/Graham Tongue	1984	1991
DB37	Jogging Music Box	Harry Sales/David Lyttleton	1987	1989
DB38	Mr Bunnybeat Strumming Music Box	Harry Sales/David Lyttleton	1987	1989
DB39	Mrs Bunnykins at the Easter Parade Music Box	Harry Sales/David Lyttleton	1987	1991
DB40	Aerobic	Harry Sales/David Lyttleton	1985	1988
DB41	Freefall	Harry Sales/David Lyttleton	1986	1989
DB42	Ace	Harry Sales	1986	1989
DB43	Home Run	Harry Sales/David Lyttleton	1986	1993
DB44	Ballet - Note: Never Produced	Harry Sales/David Lyttleton	n/a	n/a
DB45	King John (Royal Family series)	Harry Sales/David Lyttleton	1986	1990
DB46	Queen Sophie (Royal Family series)	Harry Sales/David Lyttleton	1986	1990
DB47	Princess Beatrice (Royal Family series)	Harry Sales/David Lyttleton	1986	1990
DB48	Prince Frederick (Royal Family series)	Harry Sales/David Lyttleton	1986	1990
DB49	Harry the Herald (Royal Family series)	Harry Sales/David Lyttleton	1986	1990
DB50	Uncle Sam	Harry Sales/David Lyttleton	1986	2001
DB51	Mr Bunnykins at the Easter Parade (2nd Variation)	Harry Sales/David Lyttleton	1986	1986
DB52	Mrs Bunnykins at the Easter Parade (2nd Variation)	Harry Sales/David Lyttleton	1986	1986
DB53	Carol Singer Music Box	Harry Sales/David Lyttleton	1986	1990
DB54	Collector	Harry Sales/David Lyttleton	1987	1987
DB55	Bedtime	Graham Tongue/David Lyttleton	1987	1998
DB56	Be Prepared	Graham Tongue/David Lyttleton	1987	1996
DB57	Schooldays	Graham Tongue/David Lyttleton	1987	1994
DB58	Australian	Harry Sales/Warren Platt	1988	1988
DB59	Storytime (2nd Variation)	Walter Hayward/Albert Hallam	1987	1987
DB60	Schoolmaster	Graham Tongue/Warren Platt	1987	1996
DB61	Brownie	Graham Tongue/Warren Platt	1987	1993
DB62	Santa "Happy Christmas" Christmas Tree Ornament	Harry Sales/David Lyttleton	1987	1987
DB63	Bedtime (2nd Variation)	Graham Tongue/David Lyttleton	1987	1987
DB64	Policeman	Graham Tongue/Martyn Alcock	1988	2000
DB65	Lollipopman	Graham Tongue/Martyn Alcock	1988	1991
DB66	Schoolboy	Graham Tongue/Martyn Alcock	1988	1991
DB67	Family Photograph (2nd Variation)	Walter Hayward/Albert Hallam	1988	1988
DB68	Father, Mother and Victoria	Walter Hayward/Martyn Alcock	1986	1996
DB69	William	Walter Hayward/Martyn Alcock	1988	1993
DB70	Susan	Walter Hayward/Martyn Alcock	1988	1993
DB71	Polly	Graham Tongue/Martyn Alcock	1988	1993
DB72	Tom	Graham Tongue/Martyn Alcock	1988	1993
DB73	Harry	Graham Tongue/Martyn Alcock	1988	1993
DB74A	Nurse (Red Cross)	Graham Tongue/Martyn Alcock	1989	1994
DB74B	Nurse (Green Cross)	Graham Tongue/Martyn Alcock	1994	2000
DB75	Fireman	Graham Tongue/Martyn Alcock	1989	2001
DB76	Postman	Graham Tongue/Martyn Alcock	1989	1993
DB77	Paperboy	Graham Tongue/Martyn Alcock	1989	1993
DB78	Tally Ho! (2nd Variation)	Walter Hayward/Albert Hallam	1988	1988
DB79	Bedtime (3rd Variation)	Graham Tongue/David Lyttleton	1988	1988
DB80	Dollie Playtime (2nd Variation)	Walter Hayward/Albert Hallam	1988	1988
DB81	Sleigh Ride (2nd Variation)	Walter Hayward/Albert Hallam	1989	1989
DB82	Ice Cream	Graham Tongue/Warren Platt	1990	1993
DB83	Susan as Queen of the May	Graham Tongue/Martyn Alcock	1990	1992
DB84	Fisherman	Graham Tongue/Warren Platt	1990	1993
DB85	Cook	Graham Tongue/Warren Platt	1990	1994
DB86	Sousaphone (Blue Oompah Band)	Harry Sales/David Lyttleton	1990	1990
DB87	Trumpeter (Blue Oompah Band)	Harry Sales/David Lyttleton	1990	1990
DB88	Cymbals (Blue Oompah Band)	Harry Sales/David Lyttleton	1990	1990
DB89	Drummer (Blue Oompah Band)	Harry Sales/David Lyttleton	1990	1990
DB90	Drum-Major (Blue Oompah Band)	Harry Sales/David Lyttleton	1990	1990
DB91	King John (2nd Variation)	Harry Sales/David Lyttleton	1990	1990
DB92	Queen Sophie (2nd Variation)	Harry Sales/David Lyttleton	1990	1990
DB93	Princess Beatrice (2nd Variation)	Harry Sales/David Lyttleton	1990	1990
DB94	Prince Frederick (2nd Variation)	Harry Sales/David Lyttleton	1990	1990
DB95	Harry the Herald (2nd Variation)	Harry Sales/David Lyttleton	1990	1990
DB96	Touchdown Ohio State University	Harry Sales/David Lyttleton	1990	1990
DB97	Touchdown University of Michigan	Harry Sales/David Lyttleton	1990	1990
DB98	Touchdown Cincinnati Bengals	Harry Sales/David Lyttleton	1990	1990
DB99	Touchdown Notre Dame College	Harry Sales/David Lyttleton	1990	1990

== Figurines DB100 to DB199 ==
Number	Title	Designed by/Modeled by	From	To
DB100	Touchdown Indiana University	Harry Sales/David Lyttleton	1990	1990
DB101	Bride	Graham Tongue/Amanda Hughes	1991	2001
DB102	Groom	Graham Tongue/Martyn Alcock	1991	2001
DB103	Bedtime (4th Variation)	Graham Tongue/David Lyttleton	1991	1991
DB104	Carol Singer	Harry Sales/David Lyttleton	1991	1991
DB105	Sousaphone (Green Oompah Band)	Harry Sales/David Lyttleton	1991	1991
DB106	Trumpeter (Green Oompah Band)	Harry Sales/David Lyttleton	1991	1991
DB107	Cymbals (Green Oompah Band)	Harry Sales/David Lyttleton	1991	1991
DB108	Drummer (Green Oompah Band)	Harry Sales/David Lyttleton	1991	1991
DB109	Drum-Major (Green Oompah Band)	Harry Sales/David Lyttleton	1991	1991
DB110	Royal Family Variation - Note: Never produced		n/a	n/a
DB111	Royal Family Variation - Note: Never produced		n/a	n/a
DB112	Royal Family Variation - Note: Never produced		n/a	n/a
DB113	Royal Family Variation - Note: Never produced		n/a	n/a
DB114	Royal Family Variation - Note: Never produced		n/a	n/a
DB115	Harry the Herald (2nd Variation)	Harry Sales/David Lyttleton	1991	1991
DB116	Goalkeeper	Denise Andrews/Warren Platt	1991	1991
DB117	Footballer	Denise Andrews/Warren Platt	1991	1991
DB118	Goalkeeper (2nd Variation)	Denise Andrews/Warren Platt	1991	1991
DB119	Footballer (2nd Variation)	Denise Andrews/Warren Platt	1991	1991
DB120	Goalkeeper (3rd Variation)	Denise Andrews/Warren Platt	1991	1991
DB121	Footballer (3rd Variation)	Denise Andrews/Warren Platt	1991	1991
DB122	Goalkeeper (4th Variation)	Denise Andrews/Warren Platt	1991	1991
DB123	Footballer (4th Variation)	Denise Andrews/Warren Platt	1991	1991
DB124	Rock and Roll		1991	1991
DB125	Milkman		1992	1991
DB126	Magician		1992	1991
DB127	Guardsman		1992	1991
DB128	Clown		1992	1991
DB129	Clown (2nd Variation)		1992	1991
DB130	Sweetheart		1992	1997
DB131	Master Potter		1992	1993
DB132	Halloween		1993	1997
DB133	Aussie Surfer		1994	1997
DB134	John Bull		1993	1993
DB135	Constable Mountie		1993	1993
DB136	Sergeant Mountie		1993	1993
DB137	60th Anniversary		1994	1993
DB138	Never Issued			
DB139	Never Issued			
DB140	Never Issued			
DB141	Never Issued			
DB142	Cheerleader Red		1994	1994
DB143	Cheerleader (2nd Variation)		1994	1994
DB144	Batsman		1994	1994
DB145	Bowler		1994	1994
DB146	Christmas Surprise		1994	2000
DB147	Rainy Day		1994	1997
DB148	Bathtime		1994	1997
DB149	Easter Greetings		1995	1999
DB150	Wicket Keeper		1995	1995
DB151	Partners in Collecting		1995	1995
DB152	Boy Skater		1995	1998
DB153	Girl Skater		1995	1997
DB154	Father		1996	1996
DB155	Mother's Day		1995	2000
DB156	Gardener		1996	1998
DB157	Goodnight		1995	1999
DB158	New Baby		1995	1999
DB159	Magician (2nd Variation)		1998	1998
DB160	Out for a Duck		1995	1995
DB161	Jester		1995	1995
DB162	Trick or Treat		1995	1995
DB163	Beefeater		1996	1996
DB164	Juggler		1996	1996
DB165	Ringmaster		1996	1996
DB166	Sailor		1997	1997
DB167	Mother and Baby		1997	2001
DB168	Wizard (2000 units)		1997	1997
DB169	Jockey		1997	1997
DB170	Fisherman - 2nd style		1997	2000
DB171	Joker		1997	1997
DB172	Welsh Lady		1997	1997
DB173	Bridesmaid		1997	1999
DB174	Sweetheart (2nd Variation)		1997	1997
DB175	Uncle Sam (2nd Variation)		1997	1997
DB176	Ballerina		1998	2001
DB177	Seaside		1998	1998
DB178	Irishman		1998	1998
DB179	Cavalier		1998	1998
DB180	Scotsman		1998	1998
DB181	Doctor		1998	2000
DB182	Banjo (Jazz Band)		1999	1999
DB183	Fireman (2nd Variation)		1998	1999
DB184	Clarinet (Jazz Band)		1999	1999
DB185	Double Base (Jazz Band)		1999	1999
DB186	Saxophone (Jazz Band)		1999	1999
DB187	Boy Skater (2nd Variation)		1998	1998
DB188	Judge		1999	1999
DB189	Mother		1999	1999
DB190	Tourist		1999	1999
DB191	Piper		1999	1999
DB192	Santa's Helper		1998	1998
DB193	Detective		1998	1998
DB194	Merry Christmas Tableau		1999	1999
DB195	Sydney		1999	1999
DB196	Angel		1999	2001
DB197	Mystic		1999	1999
DB198	Statue of Liberty		1999	1999
DB199	Airman (5000 units)		1999	1999

== Figurines DB200 to DB299 ==
Number	Title	Designed by/Modeled by	From	To
DB200	Happy Millennium Tableau		2000	2000
DB201	Cowboy		1999	1999
DB202	Indian		1999	1999
DB203	Businessman		1999	1999
DB204	Morris Dancer		2000	2000
DB205	African Runner (Bunnykins Games)		1999	1999
DB206	Aussie Swimmer (Bunnykins Games)		1999	1999
DB207	Asian Gymnast (Bunnykins Games)		1999	1999
DB208	US Basketball (Bunnykins Games)		1999	1999
DB209	European Footballer (Bunnykins Games)		1999	1999
DB210	Trumpet (Jazz Band)		1999	1999
DB211	Minstrel		1999	1999
DB212	Pilgrim		1999	1999
DB213	Sundial		2000	2000
DB214	Lawyer		2000	2000
DB215	Sightseer		2000	2000
DB216a	England Athlete		2000	2000
DB216a	England Athlete		2000	2000
DB217	Old Balloon Seller		2000	2000
DB218	Fortune Teller		2000	2000
DB219	Britannia		2000	2000
DB220	Little Bo Peep		2000	2004
DB221	Little Jack Horner		2000	2004
DB222	Jack and Jill		2000	2004
DB223	Choir Singer		2001	2001
DB224	Federation		2000	2000
DB225	Easter Surprise		2000	2000
DB226	Mother and Baby (2nd Variation)		2000	2000
DB227	Father (2nd Variation)		2000	2000
DB228	Sandcastle Money Box		2001	2002
DB229	Sands of Time		2001	2001
DB230	Little Red Riding Hood		2001	2001
DB231	Cinderella		2002	2002
DB232	Not Issued			
DB233	Shopper		2001	2004
DB234	Mr Punch		2001	2001
DB235	Judy		2001	2001
DB236	Waltzing Matilda		2001	2001
DB237	Father Christmas		2001	2001
DB238	On-Line		2001	2001
DB239	Little Boy Blue		2002	2004
DB240	Little Miss Muffet		2002	2004
DB241	Bathnight Tableau		2001	2001
DB242	Tyrolean Dancer		2001	2001
DB243	Little John (Robin Hood Collection)		2001	2004
DB244	Robin Hood (Robin Hood Collection)		2001	2004
DB245	Maid Marion (Robin Hood Collection)		2001	2004
DB246	Friar Tuck		2001	2004
DB247	Mary Mary Quite Contrary		2002	2004
DB248	Digger		2001	2001
DB249	Dodgem		2001	2001
DB250	Drummer (Jazz Band)		2002	2002
DB251	Captain Cook		2002	2002
DB252	Mandarin		2002	2002
DB253	Stopwatch		2002	2002
DB254	Vicar		2002	2002
DB255	Golfer		2001	2002
DB256	Flamenco		2002	2002
DB257	Liberty Bell		2001	2001
DB258	King Richard (Robin Hood Collection)		2002	2004
DB259	Town Crier		2002	2002
DB260	Day Trip		2002	2002
DB261	Hornpiper		2003	2003
DB262	Basketball Player (2nd Variation)		2002	2002
DB263	Mermaid		2003	2003
DB264	Will Scarlet (Robin Hood Collection)		2002	2004
DB265	Sheriff of Nottingham (Robin Hood Collection)		2002	2004
DB266	Prince John (Robin Hood Collection)		2002	2004
DB267	Chocks Away		2003	2003
DB268	American Firefighter		2002	2002
DB269	With Love		2002	2004
DB270	Wee Willie Winkie		2002	2004
DB271	Caddie		2002	2004
DB272	Test century		2003	2003
DB273	Deep Sea Diver		2003	2003
DB274	Dutch		2003	2003
DB275	Eskimo		2003	
DB276	Sweet Dreams Baby Bunny		2002	2004
DB277	Tennis and Strawberries Mother and Daughter		2002	2002
DB278	Tennis and Strawberries Father and Son		2002	2002
DB279	Ship ahoy		2004	2004
DB280	Samurai		2003	2003
DB281	Matador		2003	2003
DB282	Ice Hockey		2003	2003
DB283	Juliet		2003	2003
DB284	Romeo		2003	2003
DB285	Christmas Morning (Occasions Collection)		2003	
DB286	Graduation Day (Occasions Collection)		2003	
DB287	Wedding Day (Occasions Collection)		2003	
DB288	Love Heart (Occasions Collection)		2003	
DB289	Easter Treat (Occasions Collection)		2003	
DB290	Birthday Girl(Occasions Collection)		2003	
DB291	Congratulations (Occasions Collection)		2003	
DB292	Easter parade (Occasions Collection)		2003	
DB293	Witches cauldron		2004	2004
DB294	Centurian (Roman Empire Collection)		2004	
DB295	Ankhesenamun		2004	2004
DB296	Tutankhamun		2004	2004
DB297	Winter Lapland		2004	2004
DB298	Summer Lapland		2004	2004
DB299	Sir Galahad (Arthurian Legends Collection)		2004	

== Figurines DB300 to DB399 ==
Number	Title	Designed by/Modeled by	From	To
DB300	Sir Gawain (Arthurian Legends Collection)		2004	
DB301	Sir Lancelot (Arthurian Legends Collection)		2004	
DB302	Queen Guenivere (Arthurian Legends Collection)		2004	
DB303	Merlin (Arthurian Legends Collection)		2004	
DB304	King Arthur (Arthurian Legends Collection)		2004	
DB305	King Henry (Tudor Collection)		2003	
DB306	Catherine of Aragon (Tudor Collection)		2003	
DB307	Anne Boloyne (Tudor Collection)		2003	
DB308	Jane Seymour (Tudor Collection)		2003	
DB309	Anne of Cleeves (Tudor Collection)		2003	
DB310	Katherine Howard (Tudor Collection)		2003	
DB311	Catherine Parr (Tudor Collection)		2003	
DB312	Emperor (Roman Empire Collection)		2004	
DB313	Betsy Ross		2003	
DB314	Egyptian		2004	
DB315	Arabian Nights		2004	
DB316	Mexican		2004	
DB317	Parisian		2004	
DB318	Rugby Player		2004	
DB319	Captain (Shipmates Collection)		2004	
DB320	Captain's Wife (Shipmates collection)		2004	
DB321	Pirate (Shipmates Collection)		2004	
DB322	Seaman (Shipmates Collection)		2004	
DB323	Boatswain (Shipmates Collection)		2004	
DB324	Cabin Boy (Shipmates Collection)		2004	
DB325	Ships Cook (Shipmates Collection)		2004	
DB326	Gladiator (Roman Empire Collection)		2004	
DB327	Christening Girl (Occasions Collection)		2005	
DB328	Christening Boy (Occasions Collection)		2005	
DB329	Graduation Time (Occasions Collection)		2005	
DB330	Randolf the Ringmaster		2005	2005
DB331	Clarissa the Clown		2005	2005
DB332	Clarence the Clown		2005	2005
DB333	Tino the Trixstar		2005	2005
DB334	Sister Mary Barbara		2005	
DB335	Mrs Collector		2005	
DB336	Not issued yet			
DB337	Not issued yet			
DB338	Not issued yet			
DB339	Not issued yet			
DB340	Not issued yet			
DB341	Not issued yet			
DB342	Christmas Elf Ornament		2005	2006
DB343	Father Christmas Ornament		2005	2006
DB344	Mother Christmas Ornament		2005	2006
DB345	Christmas Angel Ornament		2005	2006
DB346	Christmas Eve Ornament		2005	2006
DB347	Christmas Cracker Ornament		2005	2006
DB348	Christmas Carol Singer Ornament		2005	2006
DB349	Christmas Busker Ornament		2005	2006
DB350	Prince John (Gold Edition) (3500 units)		2005	
DB351	King Richard (Gold Edition) (3500 units)		2005	
DB352	Will Scarlet (Gold Edition) (3500 units)		2005	
DB353	Sheriff of Nottingham (Gold Edition) (3500 units)		2005	
DB354	Friar Tuck (Gold Edition) (3500 units)		2005	
DB355	Little John (Gold Edition) (3500 units)		2005	
DB356	Maid Marion (Gold Edition) (3500 units)		2005	
DB357	Robin Hood (Gold Edition) (3500 units)		2005	
DB358	Not issued yet			
DB359	Scarecrow		2005	
DB360	Umpire		2005	
DB361	Just Like New		2005	
DB362	All Fuelled Up		2005	
DB363	Ready to ride		2005	
DB364	Bunnykins Camping		2005	
DB365	Nelson		2005	
DB366	Balloon Man		2005	
DB367	George Washington		2005	
DB368	Aussie Shearer		2005	
DB369	Pilot		2006	
DB370	Sailor		2006	
DB371	Homeguard		2006	
DB372	Land Girl		2006	
DB373	Evacuee Boy & Girl		2006	
DB374	Barrister		2006	
DB375	Nurse		2006	
DB376	Fireman		2006	
DB377	Postman		2006	
DB378	Plumber		2006	
DB379	Chef		2006	
DB380	Teacher		2006	
DB381	Doctor		2006	
DB382	Air Controller		2006	
DB383	Not issued yet			
DB384	Not issued yet			
DB385	Not issued yet			
DB386	Not issued yet			
DB387	Not issued yet			
DB388	Not issued yet			
DB389	Not issued yet			
DB383	Not issued yet			
DB384	Not issued yet			
DB390	The Violinist		2006	
DB391	The Flute Player		2006	
DB392	The Marimba Player		2006	
DB393	The Cellist		2006	
DB394	The cymbal player		2006	
DB395	The French Horn Player		2006	
DB396	The Conductor		2006	
DB397	St Patrick		2006	
DB398	St George		2006	
DB399	St Andrew		2006	

== Figurines DB400 to DB516 ==
Number	Title	Designed by/Modeled by	From	To
DB400	St David		2006	
DB401	William Reading without Tears		2006	
DB402	Polly		2006	
DB403	Mother		2006	
DB404	Father			
DB405	Kiln Placer			
DB406	Ned Kelly			
DB407	2006 Mascot			
DB408	1966 Mascot			
DB409	2006 Winner's Trophy			
DB410	1966 Winner's Trophy			
DB411	Pearly Queen			
DB412	Pearly King			
DB413	Vasco de Gama (Explorers Collection)			
DB414	Marco Polo (Explorers Collection)			
DB415	Sir Francis Drake (Explorers Collection)			
DB416	Sir Walter Rayleigh (Explorers Collection)			
DB417	Sir Christopher Columbus (Explorers Collection)			
DB418	Scott of the Antarctic (Explorers Collection)			
DB419	Dr. Livingstone (Explorers Collection)			
DB420	Christmas Surprise			
DB421	Little Stocking Filler			
DB422	Dashing Through the Snow			
DB423	Saggar Maker			
DB424	Caught a Whopper			
DB425	He Shoots, He Scores			
DB426	Little Ballerina			
DB427	On the Fairway			
DB428	Retail Therapy			
DB429	Home Grown			
DB430	Boy Scout			
DB431	Girl Guide			
DB432	Scout Leader			
DB433	Guide Leader		2007	
DB434	Eureka (1000 units)	Wendy Boyce-Davies	2007	
DB435	Centenary Scout (1000 units)			
DB436	Alexander Graham Bell			
DB437	Isambard Kingdom Brunel			
DB438	James Brindley			
DB439	John Logie Baird			
DB440	Mould Maker (500 units)	Shane Ridge	2007	
DB441	Once Upon A Time		2008	
DB442	William Listening Intently		2008	
DB443	Polly Daydreaming		2008	
DB444	Little Sleepyhead		2008	
DB445	Slap Shot		2008	
DB446	Home Run Hero		20??	
DB447	Don't Let Go		20??	
DB448	Out For A Duck Pastimes Collection		2008	
DB449	Heading For A Try Pastimes Collection		20??	
DB450	Deuce Pastimes Collection		20??	
DB451	BunMug 75th Anniversary		20??	
DB497	Outdoor Dunny (1000 units)		2012	
DB498	Off to School Bunnykins of the Year	Neil Faulkner	2013	
DB499	Bedtime Story Tableau of the year (550 units)		2013	
DB500	Cup Cakes (2000 units hobbies series)		2013	
DB501	Budding Artist (2000 units hobbies series)		2013	
DB502	Catch Of The Day (2000 units hobbies series)		2013	
DB503	Say Cheese (2000 units hobbies series)		2013	
DB504	Queensland SES (1000 units)		2013	
DB505	Aussie BBQ Tableau (500 units)	Wendy Boyce-Davies	2013	
DB506	Sydney Harbour Bridge Bunnykins (1000 units)		2013	
DB507	Great Barrier Reef Tableau (500 units)		2013	
DB508	Bunnykins Aussie Rules (1000 units)		2013	
DB509	Wax On Bunnykins (1000 units)		2013	
DB510	Barbara Makes a Daisy Chain Bunnykins of the Year		2014	
DB511	Cuthbert in the Garden Tableau of the Year (500 units)		2014	
DB512	Jackaroo Bunnykins (500 units)		2014	
DB513	Crocodile Hunter Bunnykins (1000 units)		2014	
DB514	Aussie Breakfast Bunnykins (1000 units)		2014	
DB515	Prince George Meets a Bilby Bunnykins (500 units)		2015	
DB516	Coo-ee Ltd Edition (750 units)		2015	
DB517	The Fair Jester Bunnykins (300 units)		2017	

== See also ==
- Beswick Pottery
- Mary Barbara Bailey
