= John Lees (footballer) =

English footballer

Personal information
- Place of birth: Derby, England
- Position: Forward

Senior career*
| Years | Team | Apps | (Gls) |
- Sawley Rangers
| 1888–1889 | Derby County | 10 | (2) |
- * Club domestic league appearances and goals

John Lees was an English footballer who played for Derby County.

== Playing career ==
Inside-right was another position where Derby County appeared to have a problem in the 1888–1889 Football league campaign. By the end of the season they had tried eight different players and the most any played in that position (in the Football League) was four.

In the first eight League matches played by Derby County the club had already tried three players at inside-right, the latest having been William Chatterton. After the 6–2 thrashing at Everton Chatterton was out of favour and so John Lees was selected to make his debut on 3 November 1888 at Dudley Road, Wolverhampton, then home of high-flying Wolverhampton Wanderers.

The match was played in poor weather conditions and attendance was low. Wolves pressed Derby but it took Wolves 30 minutes to score the first goal. They added another before half-time to lead 2–0. The second half was closer fought. Wolves went 3–0 up but John Lees scored to give Derby County hope of a comeback. However, that was snuffed out by Wolves fourth goal. Derby County lost 4–1.

John Lees was not picked again until the closing stages of the season in March 1889. For match 19, the visit of Aston Villa, on 9 March 1889 George Bakewell, the first choice at outside-right was not available so John Lees came back into the team to cover for Bakewell. Aston Villa led at half-time, 2–1 but early in the second-half Lewis Cooper got Derby County' second equaliser when he turned in a John Lees cross. Derby County won the match 5–2.

John Lees played five League matches, four at inside right and one at outside-right. He scored two League goals. Derby County finished 10th in the Football League scoring 41 goals and conceding 61 goals in 22 games. The latter was the third worst defence performance in 1888–1889.

Lees was retained at the end of the 1888–1889 season and played five more matches in the 1889–1890 Derby County team.
