= Royal Doulton Bunnykins =

Ceramic nursery dishes and figurines

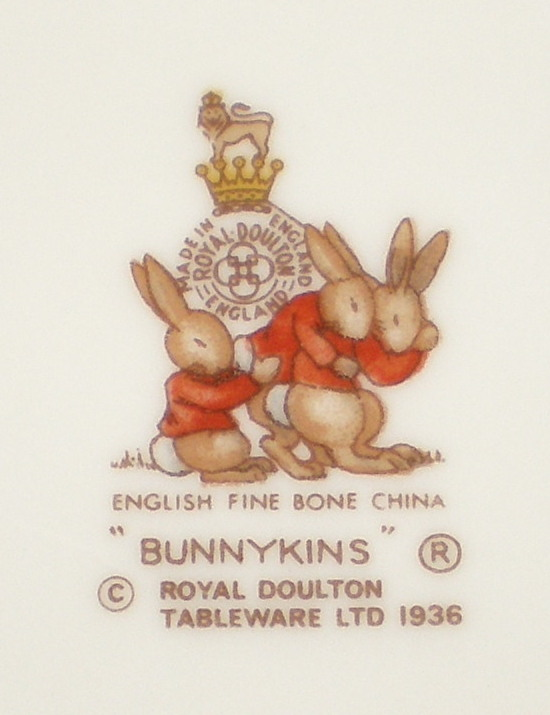
Royal Doulton Bunnykins tableware backstamp

Royal Doulton Bunnykins tableware and figurines are popular ceramic designs manufactured as nursery dishes and collectible figurines. The chinaware line originated with artwork by Sister Mary Barbara Bailey (née Barbara Vernon Bailey), the daughter of Cuthbert Bailey, general manager of Doulton during the 1930s. Unbeknownst to the public, Mary Barbara Bailey was not a professional illustrator, but a nun in the Augustinian Canonesses of the Lateran. Sister Mary Barbara provided illustrations to the designers of Doulton & Co. to be used on tableware. Six Bunnykins figurines were produced based on Sister Mary Barbara's illustrations in 1939 and were designed by Charles Noke. Discontinued during World War II, Bunnykins figurines were not reintroduced until 1969. Bunnykins continued to be produced in England until 2005. Bunnykins figurines and tableware are currently produced in Asia.

== History ==
=== Tableware ===
Introduced in 1934, Bunnykins tableware depicted Mr. and Mrs. Bunnykins and other rabbits dressed in human clothing, in colorful rural and small-town English scenes, transfer-printed on white china. The earliest pieces, signed "Barbara Vernon" (Sister Mary Barbara Bailey), are quite rare and highly prized. Bunnykins china was used by Princess Elizabeth and Princess Margaret and thus became a popular present given as christening and birthday gifts in middle-class English homes. In 1950 Sister Mary Barbara Bailey quit producing drawings for Doulton & Co. A succession of artists took her place providing designs for tableware and figurines.

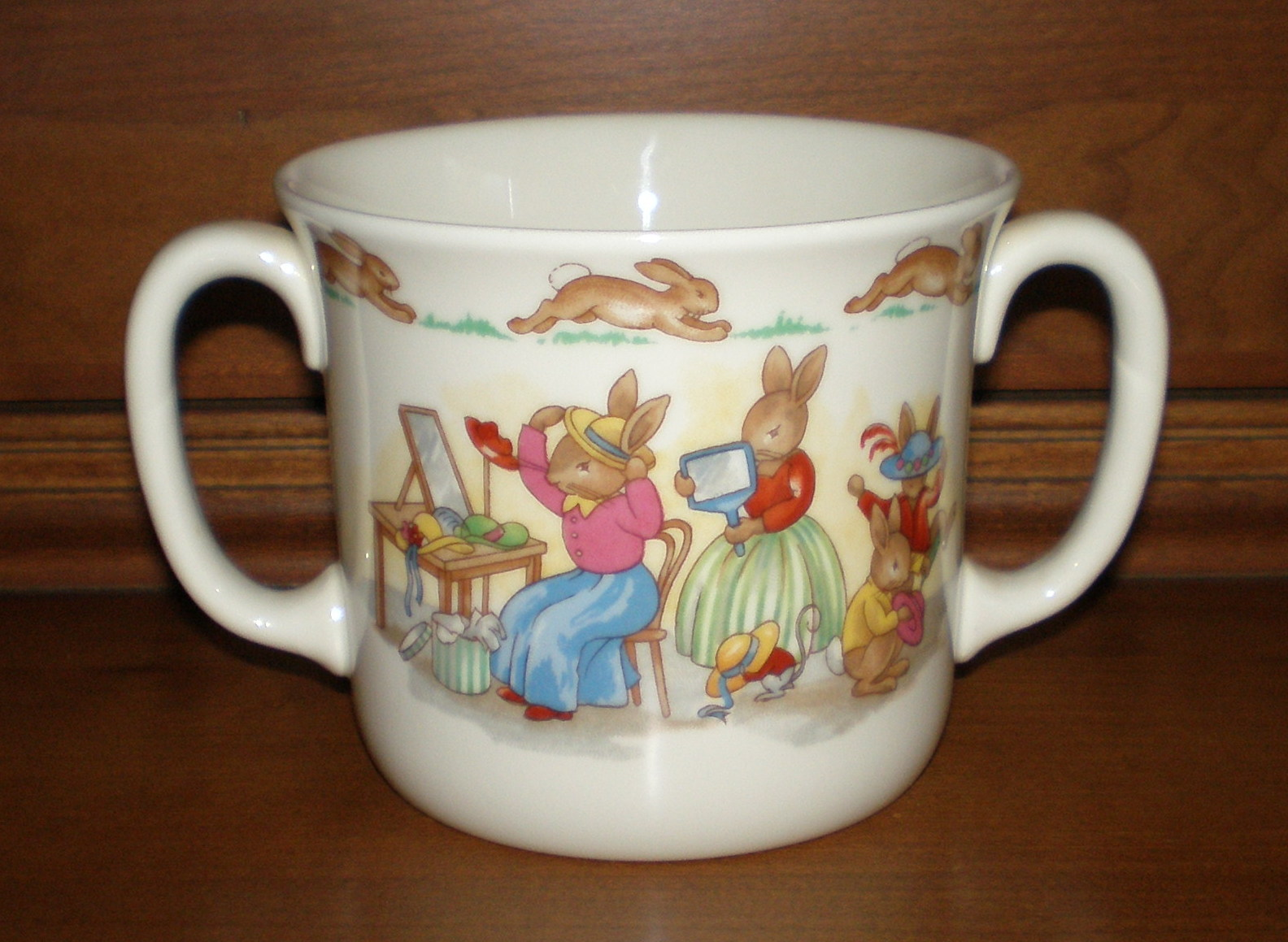
Royal Doulton Bunnykins tableware two-handled cup

In the early 1950s designs by Sister Mary Barbara were discontinued. Royal Doulton art director Walter Hayward then began designing Bunnykins for production. Bunnykins drawings by Walter were published in the story book Picnic for Bunnykins published by Kestrel Books in 1984.

=== Figurines ===
Figurines by Charles Noke featuring various Bunnykins characters began in 1939. The first line consisted of only six designs. All factories were closed for the duration of World War II, bringing production to a halt, and thus these six figurines have also become very rare. Following the war, production of Bunnykins figurines did not restart until Royal Doulton purchased the Beswick factory in 1969. After this, Bunnykins were numbered with the prefix DB. Figurines were designed by Royal Doulton art director Walter Hayward and design manager Harry Sales.

The Bunnykins figurine line is famous for the large number of professions, historical and literary figures, and traditional costumes interpreted as rabbits. Named figurines include Policeman Bunnykins, Nurse Bunnykins, Sir Lancelot Bunnykins, Betsy Ross Bunnykins, Lapplander Bunnykins, Fortune Teller Bunnykins, and more. In 2005 a Bunnykins figurine honoring Barbara Vernon was produced. Titled "Sister Barbara," it depicts a cloistered nun at her drawing table, presumably painting the original Bunnykins design.

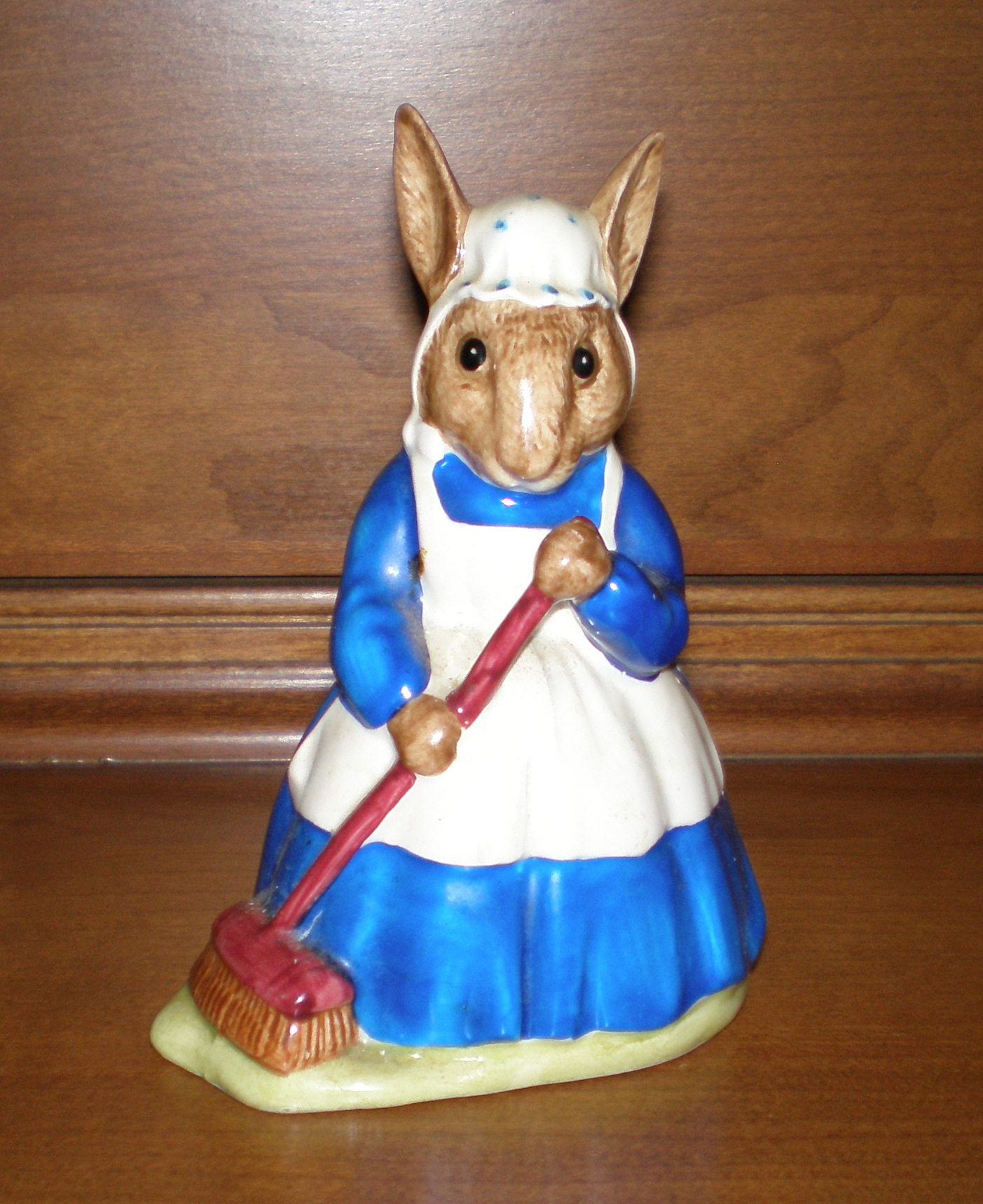
Royal Doulton Bunnykin figurine Mrs. Bunnykins "Clean Sweep", DB6, 1972-1991. From a design by Walter Hayward, modeled by Albert Hallam

== See also ==
- Royal Doulton
- Beswick Pottery
- List of Bunnykins figurines
