= Scotch Selvey =

English footballer

Personal information
- Full name: Scotch Selvey
- Date of birth: 1 November 1863
- Place of birth: Derby, England
- Date of death: 1947 (aged 83–84)
- Position: Left half

Senior career*
Years	Team	Apps	(Gls)
1886	Derby St. Luke's F.C.		
1887	Derby Midland		
1888	Derby County	1	(0)
- * Club domestic league appearances and goals

Scotch Selvey (1863-1947) was an English footballer who played for Derby County. His brother Walter was also a footballer.

Walter Roulstone was the regular left-half for Derby County in the inaugural Football League season of 1888–1889. Having played the first seven League matches at left-half, Walter Roulstone had to move position for, match number eight, the trip to Anfield, Liverpool, then home of Everton on 27 October 1888. Walter Roulstone had to move to left-back to cover for Archibald Ferguson, which gave an opportunity for Scotch Selvey to make his debut at left-half.

Everton kicked off with the wind at their backs, but Derby County took the lead through Tom Smalley. From Derby taking the lead until half-time, it was the Everton forwards versus Derby goalkeeper Joseph Marshall. However, despite Marshall's efforts, Everton players beat him three times to lead 3–1 at half-time. Everton continued from where they left off at half-time and beat Marshall twice more to make it 5–1. Everton continued to press, often defied by Marshall but, Everton made it 6-1. Derby County' Lol Plackett got a late consolation goal. Everton won 6–2, but the Anfield crowd applauded Joseph Marshall's performance. That was Scotch Selvey's only top-flight appearance. He disappeared off the football radar after this match. Derby County finished 10th in the Football League, scoring 41 goals and conceding 61 goals in 22 games, the latter being the third worst defence of the season.

Scotch Selvey died in 1947 aged 99/100.
