= Charles Noke =

English pottery designer

Charles John Noke
- Born: 1858; Worcester
- Died: 27 May 1941 (aged 82–83)
- Occupation: Pottery Designer

Charles John Noke (1858 Worcester - 27 May 1941), was an English pottery designer and artist who primarily worked for Royal Doulton.

== History ==
He is noted for producing many different ranges of pottery using differing techniques and was also hugely influential in helping Doulton establish itself as a world leader. After he joined Doulton in 1889 he became the Art Director and was able to affect all aspects of production at the Burslem site and in doing so instigated a revolution in both design and production turning Doulton into the leading art manufacturer of the age.

Noke's greatest achievement was the creation of a range of experimental transmutation glazed wares. These ranges, the Flambes, Titanian, Sung, Chinese Jade, Chang and Crystalline represent one of the greatest contributions to studio pottery made by a large British manufacturer in this century.

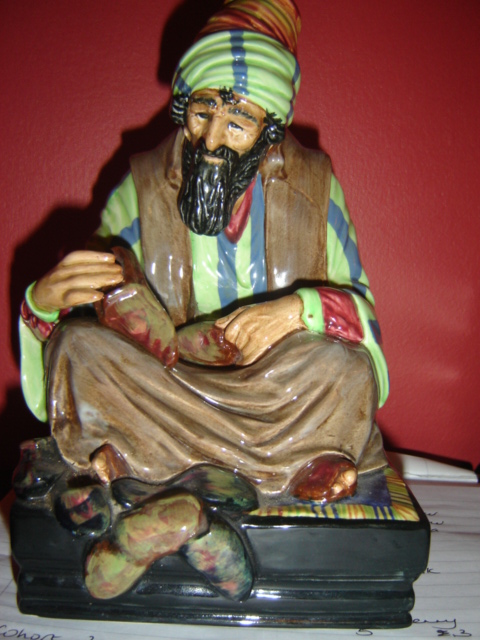
Royal Doulton Figurine, Cobbler HN1706. Designed by Charles John Noke, produced 1935-1969.

He is also well known for launching the HN figurines (named after Harry Nixon who was in charge of the figure painting department). This naming convention for figurines still endures today.

Noke contributed significantly to the character studies and some of his designs, The Jester, The Potter and The Cobbler are among the most recognisable and enduring characters produced by Doulton. He was also known for his designs of other colourful 'Eastern' characters.

Noke joined Royal Worcester as an apprentice modeler in 1873, aged 16, whilst also attending the Worcester School of Design. Noke's work at Worcester caught the eye of Doulton's Art Director John Slater (whom Noke would later succeed) and after 16 years at Royal Worcester (1889) Noke joined Royal Doulton as Chief Designer working from the Nile Street site in Burslem.

Noke's early career at Doulton was spent modelling and decorating pieces to be displayed at exhibitions around the world, most notably the Chicago World Fair in 1893. It was Noke's ambition to rival the other major pottery manufacturers of the day and Doulton mounted an extensive display of large, ornate and highly decorated vases and plates. Noke is credited with reviving the fortunes of Figurines in the Potteries and in particular at Doulton where he was able to persuade Henry Doulton that he could design figures that would sell.

In the early 1890s Noke began to experiment with figure models, the first of these being shown at the Chicago Fair. From 1909 Noke and fellow designers started to work on the design and production of what was to become the HN Series of figurines. These were first launched in 1913 with Bedtime (HN1), this was later changed to Darling after a comment, "Isn't he a little Darling?", from Queen Mary whose patronage helped to establish the series. It was from these beginnings that the vast range of Doulton figures can be found today.

Noke is credited with some of Doultons most famous creations: Flambe Ware, Kings Ware, Series Ware and Character Jugs.

Doulton's Flambe Ware is very striking with its fiery red colour and there were a variety of different pieces produced with this finish. Doulton's first flambe finished products were exhibited at the St. Louis Exhibition in 1904.

The Kings Ware glaze effect developed by Noke had a rich brown finish to it. It was used to produce many advertising items and was made by Doulton from 1901 to 1939.

The concept of Series Ware was to decorate a range of different ceramic items, e.g. plates, vases etc. with the same theme/ pattern thus making them belong together as part of a series. Noke popularised this with his series of Dickens characters.

Character Jugs varied from the traditional Toby Jugs in that they only featured the head and shoulders of a character. They were also more brightly coloured than the traditional Toby Jug. Doulton first introduced these character jugs in 1934 with Noke's own John Barleycorn.

Noke was Art Director at Doulton from 1914 until he retired from the position in 1936, aged 78. Noke continued to work at Doulton until his death in 1941.

== See also ==
- Royal Doulton
- Royal Doulton Bunnykins
- List of Bunnykins figurines
- List of Royal Doulton figurines
