= Estwick =

Estwick is a surname. Notable people with the surname include:

- Ernest Estwick (1903–1984), Guyanese cricketer
- Roddy Estwick (born 1961), Barbadian cricketer
- Sampson Estwick (c.1657–1739), English musician
- Samuel Estwick (c. 1736–1795), West India planter and British politician
