= Reuben Pitman =

English footballer

Rueben Pitman
Personal information
- Full name: Rueben John Pitman
- Date of birth: 30 April 1864
- Place of birth: Derby, England
- Date of death: 1933 (aged 68–69)
- Position: Goalkeeper

Senior career*
Years	Team	Apps	(Gls)
1888–1890	Derby County	5	(0)
- * Club domestic league appearances and goals

Rueben John Pitman (1864-1933) was an English footballer who played for Derby County.

== Playing career ==
Pitman joined Derby County sometime in 1888 just before the start of the inaugural Football League season. Apart from one match the regular Derby County goalkeeper in 1888-1889 had been Joseph Marshall footballer. On 02-Feb-1889 Derby County played their FA Cup 1st Round tie at County Ground, Derby against Derby Junction. The records do not show if Marshall was unfit or had been dropped. Either way Marshall never played top-flight football again and Reuben Pitman played in both FA Cup ties. Derby County beat Derby Junction 1-0 so a clean-sheet on Pitman' debut. However, on 16-Feb-1889 he conceded 5 as Aston Villa beat Derby County 5–3 in a 2nd Round tie at Wellington Road, Birmingham, then home of Aston Villa. Pitman made his Football League debut at County Ground, Derby, then the home of Derby County on 2 March 1889. Burnley were the visitors.

As with his FA Cup debut Pitman kept a clean-sheet and according to contemporary reports played well and assisted Derby County to hang-on and win. 0–0 at half-time and Pitman had saved from Burnley forward Willie McKay. The second half was tight. Lewis Cooper scored the winner and Pitman made "fine saves" to preserve Derby' narrow lead.

Pitman played three League matches for Derby County and kept one clean-sheet. Derby County finished 10th in the Football League conceding 61 goals, the third worst defence of that inaugural season. Pitman played in both the FA Cup ties of 1888-1889 involving Derby County and kept one clean-sheet. Derby County were eliminated in the second round.

Reuben Pitman was retained for the 1889–1890 season played twice more. He left in 1890.
