= J. Smith (footballer) =

English footballer

Personal information
- Place of birth: England
- Position: Half back

Senior career*
Years	Team	Apps	(Gls)
1888–1890	Derby County	12	(0)
- * Club domestic league appearances and goals

J. Smith was an English footballer who played in the Football League for Derby County.

Centre-Half was a problem position for Derby County in 1888–1889 and various players were tried. In the first ten games of the season three players had been tried, and Derby County had lost eight of those games and conceded 36 goals at 3.6 per game. William Hopewell was the latest to be dropped and J Smith replaced him. However, Smith could not have had a tougher start. Smith made his League and Derby County debut at Deepdale, Preston home of "The Invincibles", Preston North End on 8 December 1888. The pitch was heavy and Derby County were kicking uphill however, Hopewell and his defending colleagues made a fight of it. Preston North End got an early goal but with some great goalkeeping by Joseph Marshall and counter-attacking, Smith nearly scored on his debut, Derby County were only 1–0 down at half-time. The second-half remained even with Marshall still playing well. However, in the last 20 minutes Derby County collapsed and Preston North End added four to win 5–0.

Smith, despite a difficult start was now the mainstay at centre-half only missing two league games of the remaining 12 and he missed or, was not selected for the two FA Cup ties. Derby County finished 10th in the Football League and had to seek re-election. They conceded 61 goals in 22 games, the third worst defence of the season.

J Smith was retained for the 1889–1890 season but only played twice and then what his known about him after that is lost.
