= Sampson Estwick =

Sampson Estwick or Eastwick (c. 1657 – 1739), was an English musician.

== Birth ==
Estwick was born about 1657, or earlier, if it be true that he was one of the first set of children of the Chapel Royal under Cooke, after the Restoration, and a chorister at St. Paul's Cathedral at the same early date.

== Education ==
He proceeded B.A. at Christ Church, Oxford, in 1677, M.A. in 1680, and B.D. in 1692.

== Background ==
His intimacy with Henry Aldrich, dean of Christ Church, gave rise to the line: ‘I prithee, Sam, fill,’ in Aldrich's famous Smoking Catch. Estwick was probably too sympathetic and constant a frequenter of the rehearsals of music held weekly in the Dean's lodgings, to fall under the extreme penalty dealt unto delinquents by the genial host, namely; the restriction for the one evening to small beer, and exclusion from the next meeting.

Aldrich's management of the cathedral choir was excellent; Estwick is described by William Hayes, author of the Remarks on Mr Avison's Essay on Musical Expression (London, 1753), as a ‘remarkable instance of the effect of such a training. He was not only an excellent and zealous performer in the choral duty until extreme old age rendered him incapable of it, but a remarkable fine reader also.’ He became sixth Minor Prebend at St. Paul's Cathedral in 1692; senior cardinal, or Superintendent of the Choir, in November 1698, and Sacrist on the death of James Clifford in February 1698-9.

Estwick was appointed vicar of St. Helen's, Bishopsgate, in 1701, and rector of St. Michael's, Queenhithe, in 1712, but he continued to perform his choral duty at the cathedral till near the time of his decease, ‘when little short of ninety years of age. . . . Bending beneath the weight of years,’ Hawkins goes on to say, ‘but preserving his faculties, and even his voice, which was a deep bass, till the last, he constantly attended his duty at St. Paul's, habited in a surplice, and with his bald head covered with a black satin coif, with grey hair round the edge of it, exhibited a figure the most awful that can well be conceived.’

== Death ==
He died on 16 February 1738-9. The ‘reverend and truly venerable Mr. Estwick’ was regretted by the author of the Remarks as a ‘good man and worthy clergyman,’ while the ‘London Evening Post’ of 20 February bears witness to his ‘exemplary piety and orthodox principles.’ Estwick was said by Hawkins to have been an unsuccessful candidate for Gresham Professor of Music. He attended all the early meetmgs (from the first held in January 1725-6) of the Academy of Vocal Musick, and his name heads the list of contributors.

His sermon on ‘The Usefulness of Church Musick,’ preached at Christ Church, 27 November 1696, upon the occasion of the anniversary meeting of the lovers of music on St. Cecilia's day, was published in the same year by request of the stewards. In the dedicatory letter, Estwick deplores the tendency of the age to ‘a neglect, if not a disuse, of church musick.’ Another sermon delivered at St. Paul's, was published in 1698. His manuscript music is preserved at the Music School, and at Christ Church Library, Oxford; it includes a motet, songs, and odes to be performed at the Acts.
