= Albert Williamson =

English footballer

Personal information
- Date of birth: 14 April 1866
- Place of birth: Sawley, Derbyshire, England
- Date of death: 26 January 1951 (aged 84)
- Position: Right half

Senior career*
| Years | Team | Apps | (Gls) |
- Sawley Rangers
| 1888–1890 | Derby County | 41 | (0) |
| 1890–1891 | Notts County | 2 | (0) |
- Nottingham Forest
- * Club domestic league appearances and goals

Albert Williamson (1866 – after 1891) was an English footballer who played in the Football League as a right half for Derby County and Notts County.

Albert Williamson was signed in 1883 by a club local to where he was born, Sawley Rangers. Very little is known about Sawley Rangers except they were founder members of the Derbyshire Football Association. Albert Williamson was only at Sawley Rangers for one season, 1883–84. Albert Williamson signed for Derby County before the Football League era began in 1884, the year Derby County was founded. In the second season Williamson was on Derby County' books they reached the FA Cup second round and defeated Aston Villa 2–0. It is not recorded if Williamson played in that match.1885–86 FA Cup By September 1888 Albert Williamson was one of the regular players in the Derby County squad.

Albert Williamson made his League debut on 8 September 1888, playing as a wing–half, at Pike's Lane, the then home of Bolton Wanderers. Derby County defeated the home team 6–3. Albert Williamson appeared in 19 of the 22 League matches played by Derby County. As a wing-half (17 appearances) he played in a midfield that achieved big (three–League–goals–or–more) wins on three occasions.

Williamson stayed with Derby County for three seasons leaving in 1891. He was signed by Notts County but only played twice for them. Later in 1891 he joined Nottingham Forest.
