= David Buik =

British businessman

David Buik MBE
- Born: David Barlow Buik; 21 March 1944 (age 81); Montreal, Canada
- Education: Harrow School
- Occupation: businessman
- Known for: financial pundit for the BBC and other British, American and Australian television channels and radio stations
- Spouses: Susan Fenwick (m. 1970); Penelope Bonner (m. 1976)
- Children: 1 son; 2 daughters

David Barlow Buik MBE (born 21 March 1944) is a businessman and financial pundit for the BBC and other British, American and Australian television channels and radio stations.

== Early life ==
Buik was born in Montreal and moved to the UK in 1949. He was educated at Harrow School.

== Career ==
Buik started work at Philip Hill Higginson Erlangers in the City of London. He later worked for RP Martin, Kirkland Whitaker, London Deposit Agencies, Money Market Agencies, MY Marshall, and City Index Group. The companies he has worked for mostly involved financial spread betting. He worked for BGC Partners from 1999 to 2011. His retirement from BGC was celebrated with a dinner on 25 March 2011 at the Royal Exchange, London.

He has appeared as a financial pundit on the BBC, Bloomberg Television, CNN International ABC News (Australia) and LBC Radio.

He was appointed Member of the Order of the British Empire (MBE) in the 2016 New Year Honours for services to financial services.

== Personal life ==
Buik married Penelope Bonner in 1976 in Westminster, and they had two daughters (in 1978 and 1980). He has a son, born in April 1973, from a previous marriage in 1970 in Westminster to Susan Fenwick. He lives in Fulham, and follows Fulham Football Club.

For many years he was a wicket keeper for the Harrow Wanderers Cricket Club.
