= Walter Selvey =

English footballer

Personal information
- Full name: Walter Selvey
- Date of birth: Q1 1866
- Place of birth: Derby, England
- Date of death: 1944
- Position: Inside right

Senior career*
Years	Team	Apps	(Gls)
1887	Derby Midland		
1888	Derby County	1	(0)
1889	Derby Junction		
- * Club domestic league appearances and goals

Walter Selvey was an English footballer who played for Derby County. His brother Scotch was also a footballer.

Born in Derby during the 1st quarter of 1866. Signed and played for Derby Midland in 1887. Left the following year for Derby County. Walter Selvey, playing as a forward, made his League debut on 22 September 1888 at County Ground, the then home of Derby County. The visitors were Accrington and the match ended as a 1–1 draw. Walter Selvey appeared in one of the 22 League matches played by Derby County during the 1888–89 season.

Selvey left Derby County in 1889 and joined Derby Junction. Walter Selvey died in 1944 aged 75/76.
