= Buick (disambiguation) =

Buick is a car brand of General Motors.

Buick may also refer to:

== People ==
- David Buick (politician) (1854–1929), New Zealand politician
- David Dunbar Buick (1848–1929), inventor of the overhead valve engine and founder of the Buick Motor Company
- William Buick (born 1988), British jockey

== Places ==
- Buick, British Columbia, a community in Canada
- Buick, Missouri, a ghost town in the United States

== Other uses ==
- Buick Invitational, a former name of the Farmers Insurance Open PGA Tour golf tournament
- Buick Championship (Ladies European Tour), a golf tournament from 2014 to 2016
- Buick (album), a 1991 album by Sawyer Brown

== See also ==
- List of Buick vehicles, a list of all models produced by Buick Motor Division
- Buik (disambiguation)
