= Bill Beswick =

English sports psychologist

- Citizenship: UK
- Era: 90s

Bill Beswick is an English sports psychologist and former basketball coach.

Beswick has had roles with English football clubs Derby County, Manchester United, Middlesbrough, Nottingham Forest and Sunderland, and FC Twente in the Netherlands. Additionally, he has worked with the England U18 and U21 teams. He has had a long working relationship with Steve McClaren, and was McClaren's assistant manager at Middlesbrough.

He has also worked with numerous other teams and coaches, including Great Britain basketball teams, England rugby head coach Stuart Lancaster, and several American college teams.

Beswick also spent five years as head coach of the England basketball team, and won a gold medal in the Commonwealth championship in 1992.

He has published books including Focused for Soccer in 2000 and One Goal in 2015, as well as numerous coaching ebooks.
