= Ernest Hickinbottom =

English footballer

Personal information
- Date of birth: 1865
- Place of birth: Darley Abbey, England
- Date of death: 2 September 1939 (aged 73–74)
- Position: Midfielder

Senior career*
| Years | Team | Apps | (Gls) |
- Darley Abbey
- Derby Midland
| 1888–1893 | Derby County | 50 | (0) |
- * Club domestic league appearances and goals

Ernest Hickinbottom (born 1865 - 2 September 1939) was an English footballer who played for Derby County.

He died at the Baseball Ground watching Derby playing Aston Villa on 2 September 1939.
