= Arthur Latham (footballer) =

English footballer

Personal information
- Full name: Arthur Latham
- Date of birth: 23 January 1863
- Place of birth: Coventry, England
- Date of death: 1928 (aged 64–65)
- Position: Full-back

Senior career*
Years	Team	Apps	(Gls)
1884	St. Luke's F.C.		
1885–1886	Derby Midland		
1886–1901	Derby County	48	(1)
- * Club domestic league appearances and goals

Arthur Latham (23 January 1863 – 1928) was an English footballer who played for Derby County.

Arthur Latham first became known when he signed for St. Luke's FC in 1884 and stayed for the 1884–1885 season. In 1885 Arthur Latham moved to Derby Midland. Derby Midland had formed in 1881 and their most significant achievement as a club had occurred the previous season to Latham signing which was reaching the FA Cup third round.1883–84 FA Cup Arthur Latham signed for Derby County before the Football League era began in 1886. In the first season Latham was on Derby County' books they reached the FA Cup second round and defeated Aston Villa 2–0. It is not recorded if Latham played in that match.1885–86 FA Cup By September 1888 the Football League was inaugurated and Latham became an automatic choice for the first two seasons of League football.

Arthur Latham made his League debut on 8 September 1888, playing as a full–back, at Pike's Lane, the then home of Bolton Wanderers. Derby County defeated the home team 6–3. Arthur Latham appeared in 20 of the 22 League matches played by Derby County in season 1888–89. As a full–back (20 appearances) he played in a Derby County defence that achieved two clean–sheets and restricted the opposition to one–League–goal–in–a–match on four separate occasions.
