= Isaac Monks =

English footballer

Personal information
- Date of birth: 1 February 1865
- Place of birth: Wilson, England
- Date of death: 1930 (aged 64–65)
- Position: Defender

Senior career*
| Years | Team | Apps | (Gls) |
| 1887–1889 | Derby County | 3 | (0) |
- * Club domestic league appearances and goals

Isaac Monks (1865–1930) was an English footballer who played for Derby County.

There appears to be no record of when Isaac Monks signed for Derby County. Monks was a Derby County player in season 1887–88 as more than one source reports that Isaac Monks played centre-forward in an FA Cup first round tie against Staveley played on 15 October 1887. Derby County were the away team and defeated the home team 2–1 with Isaac Monks scoring both goals.1887-88 FA Cup

Isaac Monks made his League debut on 8 September 1888, playing at centre-half, at Pike's Lane, the then home of Bolton Wanderers. Derby County defeated the home team 6–3. Isaac Monks appeared in three of the 22 League matches played by Derby County in season 1888–89. As a centre–half (three appearances) he played in a Derby County defence that restricted the opposition to one–League–goal–in–a–match once.
