= William Hopewell =

English footballer

Personal information
- Full name: William Turtle Hopewell
- Date of birth: Q1 1867
- Place of birth: York, England
- Date of death: 1928 (aged 60–61)
- Position: Half back

Senior career*
Years	Team	Apps	(Gls)
1886	Long Eaton Rangers		
1887	Grimsby Town		
1888	Derby County	5	(0)
1889–1890	Grimsby Town		
1890–1893	Doncaster Rovers		
- * Club domestic league appearances and goals

William Turtle Hopewell (1867-1928) was an English footballer who played in the Football League for Derby County.

William Hopewell' first club was Long Eaton Rangers. Hopewell signed in 1886, two years before Rangers became a League The Combination club. The following year (1887) Hopewell moved to Lincolnshire club, Grimsby Town. In season 1887–88 Grimsby Town were still a non–League club but they did reach the Fourth Round of the FA Cup.

William Hopewell moved back to Derbyshire when he signed for Derby County in September 1888. Hopewell made his club and League debut, playing at centre–half, on 13 October 1888, at Thorneyholme Road, the home of Accrington. The home team won 6–2. William Hopewell played in five of the 22 League matches played by Derby County in season 1888–89.

In 1889 William Hopewell was not retained by Derby County and he returned to Grimsby Town. In season 1889–90 Grimsby Town were founder members of the Football Alliance League and finished fourth. They also reached the Second Round of the FA Cup. In 1890 Hopewell moved from Grimsby Town to Doncaster Rovers for the start of their Midland League season, playing at half-back.

Hopewell died at the age of 60/61 in 1928.
