= Frank Roulstone =

English footballer

Personal information
- Full name: Francis Roulstone
- Date of birth: Q4 1862
- Place of birth: Radcliffe-on-Trent, England
- Date of death: 1939 (aged 76–77)
- Position: Defender

Senior career*
Years	Team	Apps	(Gls)
1887	Sawley Rangers		
1888–1889	Derby County	1	(0)
- * Club domestic league appearances and goals

Francis Roulstone (Quarter 4 1862 to 1939) was an English footballer who played for Derby County. His brother Walter was also a footballer.

Frank Roulstone' first club was Sawley Rangers which he signed for in 1887. Very little appears to be recorded about them except the club had a representative at the Board of the first meeting of the Derbyshire Football Association.

There is no exact date recorded when Frank Roulstone left Sawley Rangers and joined Derby County but it was before October 1888. Frank, playing as a full–back, made his Derby County and League debut on 13 October 1888 at Thorneyholme Road, the home of Accrington. The visitors lost 6–2. That was the only match Frank played in out of the 22 played by Derby County in season 1888–89. He was not retained at the end of the season.
