= Thomas Needham =

English footballer

Personal information
- Date of birth: 1864
- Place of birth: Derby, England
- Position: Forward

Senior career*
Years	Team	Apps	(Gls)
1888–1890	Derby County	15	(3)
1890	Burton Swifts		
- * Club domestic league appearances and goals

Thomas Needham (born 1864) was an English footballer who played in the Football League for Derby County.

Thomas Needham, a versatile forward, was a reserve player for Derby County at the start of the Football League era. Thomas Needham, playing as a winger, made his Derby County and League debut on 6 October 1888 at Stoney Lane, the then home of West Bromwich Albion. Derby County were overwhelmed and were beaten by the home team 5–0. Thomas Needham scored his club and League debut goal on 27 October 1888 at Anfield, the then home of Everton. Needham scored with a powerful shot to put Derby County 1–0 ahead but the home team were too strong as Derby County lost 6–2. Thomas Needham appeared in nine of the 22 League matches played by Derby County in season 1888–1889, scoring one League goal. Thomas Needham played as a forward (seven appearances) in a Derby County forward–line that scored three–League–goals–or–more once. Thomas Needham also appeared as a winger in one FA Cup tie.
