= Lawrence Plackett =

English footballer

Personal information
- Date of birth: 16 January 1869
- Place of birth: Breaston, England
- Date of death: 1939 (aged 69–70)
- Position: Forward

Senior career*
Years	Team	Apps	(Gls)
1885	Long Eaton Alexandra		
1888–1889	Derby County	22	(7)
1889	Nottingham Forest		
- * Club domestic league appearances and goals

Lawrence Plackett, known as Lol Plackett, (born 1869) was an English footballer who played for Derby County and Nottingham Forest. His brother Harry was also a footballer. Lol Plackett' first club was Long Eaton Alexandra but there appear to be no records about this club. One source states Plackett signed in 1885 and another states he joined Derby County sometime in 1886.

Lol Plackett played for Derby County for two seasons prior to the Football League commencing. In season 1887–88 Derby County reached the fifth round of the FA Cup, their best FA Cup campaign since their formation in 1884. It is not recorded whether Lol Plackett played in the 1887–88 FA Cup ties.

Lol Plackett made his Football League and Club debut on 8 September 1888, playing as a forward, at Pike's Lane, the then home of Bolton Wanderers. Derby County defeated the home team 6–3 and Lol Plackett scored the fourth and sixth goals. Lol Plackett appeared in all of the 22 League matches played by Derby County in season 1888–89 and scored seven League goals. Lol Plackett was the only Derby County player in season 1888–89 to play in all 22 League matches. As a forward (seven appearances) he played in a forward–line that scored three–League–goals–or–more on two occasions. As a winger (15 appearances) he played in a midfield that achieved big (three–League–goals–or–more) wins on two occasions. Of the seven League goals scored, two came in one match, on the opening day.

Lol Plackett was not retained for the 1889–1890 season and moved to Nottingham Forest.
