= Harry Plackett =

English footballer

Personal information
- Full name: Henry Plackett
- Date of birth: 14 April 1871
- Place of birth: Breaston, England
- Date of death: 1948 (aged 76–77)
- Position: Forward

Senior career*
Years	Team	Apps	(Gls)
1887	Long Eaton Midland		
1888–1889	Derby County	16	(2)
1889	Nottingham Forest		
- * Club domestic league appearances and goals

Henry Plackett (born 14 April 1871) was an English footballer who played for Derby County and Nottingham Forest. His brother Lawrence, known as Lol Plackett was also a footballer. Harry Plackett's first club was Long Eaton Midland, a club where there are few records about its existence. According to one source Harry Plackett signed for Long Eaton Midland in 1887 but all sources agree that by 1888 Harry Plackett was on the books of Derby County.

Plackett made his Football League and Club debut on 8 September 1888, playing as a forward, at Pike's Lane, the then home of Bolton Wanderers. Derby County defeated the home team 6–3. When Harry Plackett played as a forward against Bolton Wanderers on 8 September 1888 he was 17 years 147 days old; which made him, on that first weekend of League football, Derby County's youngest player and, the Football League's youngest player. Harry Plackett scored his debut Club and League goal on 15 September 1888, playing as a forward, at County Ground, the then home of Derby County, when the visitors were West Bromwich Albion. Derby County lost to the visitors 2–1 and Plackett scored Derby County' goal. Harry Plackett appeared in 16 of the 22 League matches played by Derby County in season 1888–89 and scored two League goals. As a forward (14 appearances) he played in a forward–line that scored three–League–goals–or–more on three occasions.

In April 1889 Harry Plackett was not retained by Derby County and he moved to Nottingham Forest.
