= Alex Higgins (footballer, born 1863) =

Scottish footballer (1863–1920)

Personal information
- Full name: Alexander Higgins
- Date of birth: 7 November 1863
- Place of birth: Kilmarnock, Scotland
- Date of death: 17 April 1920 (aged 56)
- Position: Centre-forward

Senior career*
Years	Team	Apps	(Gls)
1882–1888	Kilmarnock	0	(0)
1888–1890	Derby County	42	(25)
1890–1894	Nottingham Forest	47	(18)
1894	Kilmarnock	0	(0)

International career
1885	Scotland	1	(3)
- * Club domestic league appearances and goals

Alexander Higgins (7 November 1863 – 17 April 1920) was a Scottish footballer who played for Kilmarnock, Derby County, Nottingham Forest and the Scotland national team.

== Career ==
Higgins was born in Kilmarnock, originally working as a coal-miner, and began his career in his hometown with Kilmarnock. He won his only Scotland cap while at the club on 14 March 1885. Despite scoring a hat-trick in an 8–2 win over Ireland, he was never selected again for his country; James B. Niven, later of Chelsea, also gained his only cap in that game (only Scotland-based players were considered until 1896).

Higgins joined English club Derby County in August 1888 and made his Football League debut on 8 September 1888, playing at centre-forward, at Pike's Lane, the then home of Bolton Wanderers. Derby defeated the home team 6–3. He scored his maiden League goal on 22 September at the County Ground, the then home of Derby County, when the visitors were Accrington – the match ended as a 1–1 draw and Higgins scored the Derby goal. He appeared in 21 of the 22 League matches played by Derby County in season 1888–89 and scored 11 league goals, which made him the top scorer for that season; of those goals, six came in two matches. He became the first Derby County player to score four in one league match when he scored four against Aston Villa at the County Ground on 9 March 1889.

Higgins left Derby in 1890 and joined Nottingham Forest, where he remained until 1894, when he returned to Scotland and Kilmarnock for a short unsuccessful bid for the Scottish Cup.

== Personal life ==
Higgins died on 17 April 1920, the same day his first club Kilmarnock won the Scottish Cup for the first time in their history. His son, Alex Higgins, Jr., also a Scottish international, was a registered Kilmarnock player at this point, although he did not play in the final.

== See also ==
- List of Scotland national football team hat-tricks
