= Old Bewick =

Village in Northumberland, England

Coordinates: 55.488°N 1.893°W

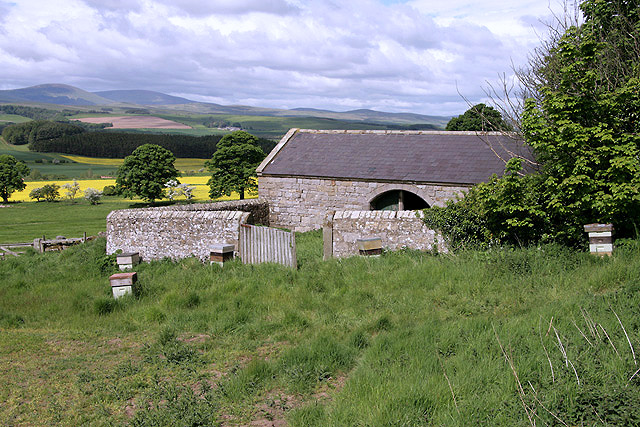

- Location within Northumberland
- OS grid reference: NU068216
- Civil parish: Bewick
- Unitary authority: Northumberland
- Ceremonial county: Northumberland
- Region: North East
- Country: England
- Sovereign state: United Kingdom
- Post town: ALNWICK
- Postcode district: NE66
- Dialling code: 01665
- Police: Northumbria
- Fire: Northumberland
- Ambulance: North East
- UK Parliament: Berwick-upon-Tweed

Old Bewick is a rural village and former civil parish, now in the parish of Bewick, in the county of Northumberland, England, notable for its Bronze Age cairn, Iron Age hill fort, 12th-century church; and for cup and ring marked stones – some of the first to be documented in Britain. In 1951 the parish had a population of 82.

== Geography ==
Old Bewick village is 4.3 kilometres (2.7 mi) west-north-west of Eglingham, and 4.6 kilometres (2.9 mi) south of Chillingham in Northumberland, England, on a south-west facing slope of the River Breamish valley at approximately 322 feet (98 m) above sea level. The village is 0.75 kilometres (0.5 mi) west of the 765-foot-high (233 m) Bewick Hill, the site of an Iron Age hill fort known as Bewick Hill Camp and comprising two adjacent semi-circular multivallate enclosures. The village is on a minor road forming a western extension of the B6346 road, as that road turns south-west, west of Harehope Hall, to join the A697 road.

The village was within the Scottish Marches, the Anglo-Scottish border area of the late medieval and early modern eras, which was characterised by violence and cross-border raids. The church was damaged by Scottish invaders in the 13th century, and it was the location of one of the many defensive towers erected in Northumberland in the 15th century.

The village's name – Old Bewick, rather than merely Bewick – seems to go back into antiquity, reflecting the development of a distinct settlement, New Bewick, 1.3 kilometres (0.81 mi) to the south and on the other side of River Breamish. Joan Blaeu's 1662 map, Comitatvs Northvmbria, shows Bewick Great and Bewick Little in positions approximating to Old and New Bewick, and both are listed in a 1663 rent roll for the district.

== History ==
John Charles Langlands, tenant of Old Bewick Farm from May 1823, wrote and presented a detailed history of Old Bewick to the Berwickshire Naturalists Club on 30 May 1866.

Langlands starts by noting that, in times before documented history, Old Bewick must have been the centre of a considerable population, given the extensive remains of camps and dwellings from the pre-Roman period; and asserts that foundations of later buildings in surrounding fields indicate that its inhabitants continued to be numerous after the Roman period, drawn together probably for protection to a fortified tower that had taken the place of the ancient camp.

The village is surrounded by hillforts, including Bewick Hill Camp noted above; Bewick Hill Moor camp, a partial contour fort 2.15 kilometres (1.34 mi) east-north-east; and Bewick Bridge East, a hillslope fort 0.86 kilometres (0.53 mi) north-west. Other prehistoric features in the vicinity of the village include cup and ring marked rocks to the east of Bewick Hill Camp; and slightly further east, round cairns north of Tick Law.

=== Cup and ring marked stones ===
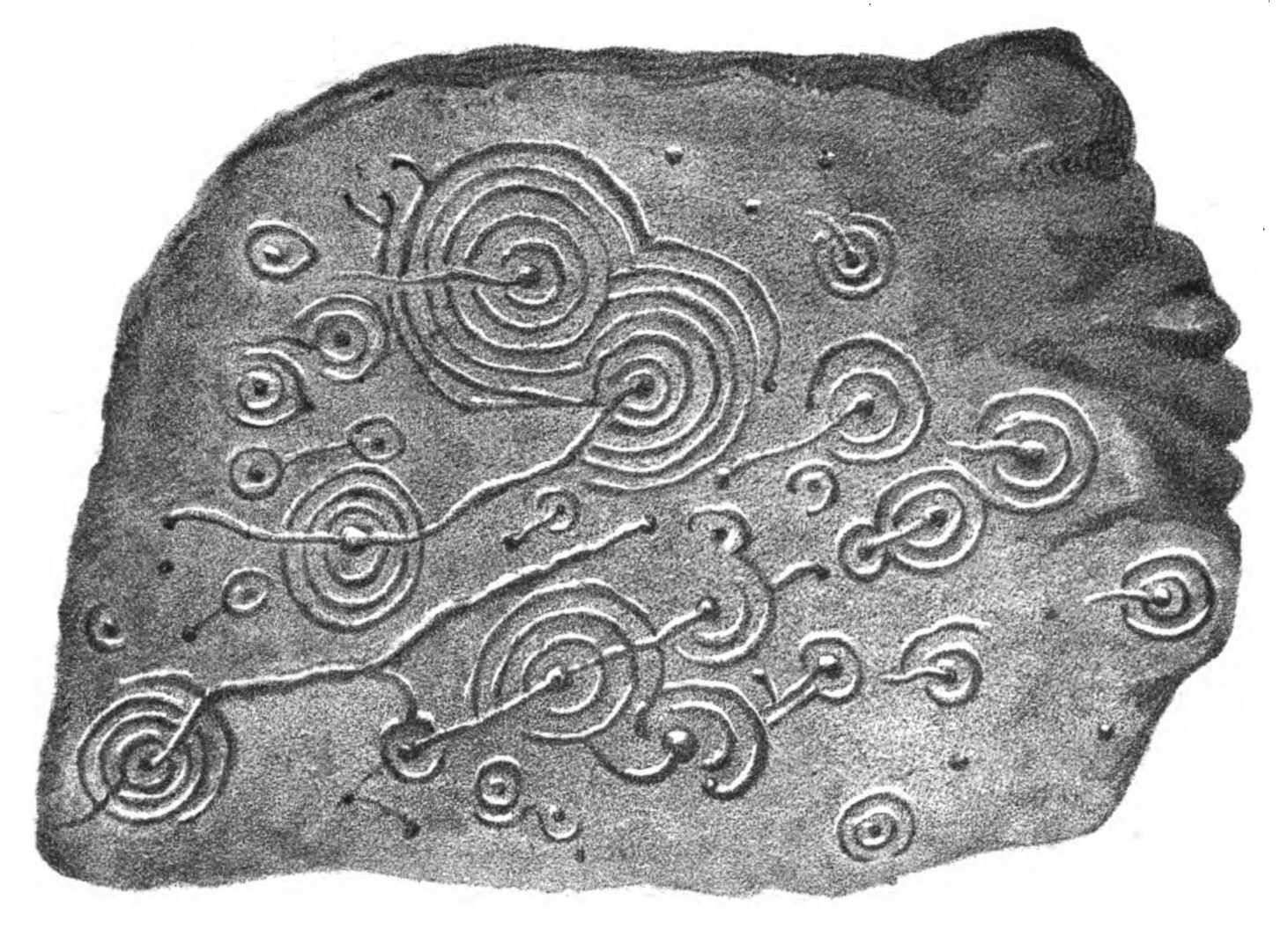
Sketch of the largest of the five cup and ring marked stones discovered by Langlands on Bewick Hill

Langlands discovered five cup and ring marked stones on the east top of Bewick Hill in the 1820s; these are amongst the earliest to be documented in Britain, notably in George Tate's 1865 The Ancient British Sculptured Rocks of Northumberland. Upon the discovery in 1852 of similar stones near Roughting Linn, near Doddington, Tate took it on himself to investigate the occurrence of these "singular and mysterious inscriptions", using the platform of his presidency of the Berwickshire Naturalists Club to promulgate interest in the subject.

Two of Langlands' stones are found within Bewick Hill Camp. One, near the outer rampart and eastern entrance, has five figures traceable, one of which is as deeply cut as 3/5 of an inch (15 mm); the centre appears as a raised boss, and the whole figure looks like the impression of a horse's foot. The other is about 20 yards (18 m) north of the first, close to the rampart, and has two figures.

A large block, 9 1/2 foot (2.9 m) by 6 1/2 foot (2.0 m), stands about 30 yards (27 m) east of the camp, and has six figures traceable on its rough sloping surfaces, the largest of which is 10 inches (250 mm) in diameter. Another block, about 100 yards (91 m) from the camp, presents two figures.

The chief group of sculptures, 27 in number, is on the first stone discovered by Langlands, about 100 yards (91 m) east of the camp; an irregular quadrangular shape, 10 foot (3.0 m) by 8 foot (2.4 m), sloping northward, and rising where highest 4 1/2 foot (1.4 m) above the ground.

=== Land ownership ===
Throughout the period of the Anglo-Saxon kingdom of Northumbria, and into the Norman period, the manor of Old Bewick was holden to the Court leet of Bamburgh Castle and tenanted under a drengage system peculiar to the kingdom, amounting to a feudal free tenantry with military duties.

Around or before 1107 the manor – termed the lands of Archi Morell – was given to Tynemouth Priory by Matilda of Scotland, daughter of Malcolm III of Scotland and wife of Henry I of England. Malcolm III had been killed in 1093 whilst campaigning near Alnwick, by Morell of Bamburgh, a steward of Robert de Mowbray, Earl of Northumberland, and was interred at Tynemouth Priory. Langlands suggests that the land formed part of Matilda's dowry. J. C. Hodgeson, writing in 1905, states that Bewick and Eglingham were lands owned by Morell of Bamburgh, confiscated in 1095 after a conspiracy to depose William II of England and place Stephen of Aumale on the English throne.

Philip C. Hardwick, in a letter to Langlands read to the Berwickshire Naturalists Club in May 1857, suggests that Old Bewick's 12th-century Church of the Holy Trinity, north-west of the village, is mainly the work of the monks of Tynemouth starting from the date of Matilda's grant, though Hardwick suspects that the apse may predate the rest of the structure.

In 1138 Old Bewick and lands around Eglingham were granted by the priory to Edgar, son of Gospatric II, Earl of Lothian, but were later seized as forfeit by Henry II of England after Edgar opposed him, and later restored to the priory in recognition of Matilda's grant. Henry III of England in 1253 granted the monks of Tynemouth the right to hold a market in Old Bewick, weekly, on a Thursday. A 1292 valuation of the manor is recorded as £30 15s 6d.

Old Bewick reverted to the Crown in January 1539 during the period of the dissolution of the monasteries under Henry VIII, and in 1551 a grant of possession was made to John Dudley, 1st Duke of Northumberland. Upon Dudley's execution for sedition, the lands once again reverted to the Crown, Elizabeth I granting possession to Henry Percy, 8th Earl of Northumberland in c.1569. The lands again reverted to the Crown on the death of the 9th Earl in 1632. Thereafter lands in the parish were held by a succession of free tenants, including by 1839 the Baker-Cresswell family.

=== Bewick Tower ===
In his 1891 The Border Holds of Northumberland, Cadwallader John Bates notes:

A most remarkable picture of the desolate and barbarous condition of the North of England has been left by Æneas Sylvius Piccolomini, afterwards Pope Pius II, who passed through it disguised as a merchant in 1486, on his return from a mission to Scotland. The entire male population of the town in which he spent the night after crossing the Border made off, he tells us, at the end of his protracted supper, for a tower at some distance for fear of the Scots, who were accustomed to take advantage of the tide being out to make a nocturnal raid across the river.

As a consequence, the border area, according to Bates, "literally bristled" with defensive towers; Old Bewick was selected as one location, and a peel tower was erected, presumably at some point in the 15th century, since the first documented mention is in a 1509 Chapter House book suggesting it could accommodate 40 horsemen. Bewick Tower is described as a "good tower" in Sir Robert Bowes and Sir Ralph Ellerker 1541 View of the Castles, Towers, Barmekyns, and Fortresses of the Frontier of the East and Middle Marches, wording which Bates suggests means it was capable of housing 50 people; but equally, despite recent repairs to part of its roof, the tower was found not to be in good repair nor completely watertight.

In a later, 1584, report by the Commissioners on the Borders, for Elizabeth I, Bewick Tower was found to be decayed, and recommendations were made that it be rebuilt (at a cost of £20) and ideally augmented by a barmkin defensive wall, and stabling for 50 horses, at a cost of £200. The recommendations do not seem to have been acted on; a 1608 survey found:

a faire stronge tower, with a garth and a dovecoate of hewen stone, which hath beene wholy covered with leade but most parte of the leade is now decayed or purloyned away wherby it is not inhabitable but in one comer that is vaulted over. This tower hath commonly beene a refuge for the Tenants ther in time of danger.

Ruins of the tower were extant in 1715, but it had been demolished and the foundations covered by the Alnwick to New Haggestone turnpike road, projected in an 1825 Local Act of Parliament and built shortly thereafter.

== Governance ==
Old Bewick is in the parliamentary constituency of Berwick-upon-Tweed. Old Bewick was formerly a township; from 1866 Old Bewick was a civil parish in its own right until it was abolished on 1 April 1955 to form Bewick.

== Sources ==
- Beckensall, Stan (2001). Northumberland. The Power of Place. Stroud, Gloucestershire: Tempus Publishing Ltd. ISBN 0 7524 1907 2.
- Langlands, John Charles (May 1866). "On the History and Natural History of Old Bewick". History of the Berwickshire Naturalists' Club. 5.
- Tate, George (1865). The Ancient British Sculptured Rocks of Northumberland and the Eastern Borders. Henry Hunter Blair, Alnwick.
- Bates, Cadwallader John (1891). The Border Holds of Northumberland.
