= Harry Bestwick =

English footballer

Personal information
- Full name: Thomas Henry Bestwick
- Date of birth: 30 May 1864
- Place of birth: Long Eaton, England
- Date of death: 1946 (aged 81–82)
- Position: Goalkeeper

Senior career*
Years	Team	Apps	(Gls)
1886	Long Eaton Rangers		
1886–1889	Derby County	1	(0)
1889	Long Eaton Rangers		
- * Club domestic league appearances and goals

Thomas Henry "Harry" Bestwick (1864 – 1946) was an English footballer who played for Derby County.

He joined Derby County sometime in 1886 and was signed from local club Long Eaton Rangers. He played in some of Derby County's FA Cup ties before League started in September 1888.

Bestwick made his League debut, in goal, on 20 October 1888 at County Ground, the then home of Derby County. The visitors were Everton who won 4–2. That was Bestwick' only appearance in the first–team in season 1888–1889.

He was not retained for the 1889–1890 season and returned to Long Eaton Rangers.
