= Bewick, Northumberland =

Civil parish in Northumberland, England

Coordinates: 55.487°N 1.899°W

Bewick
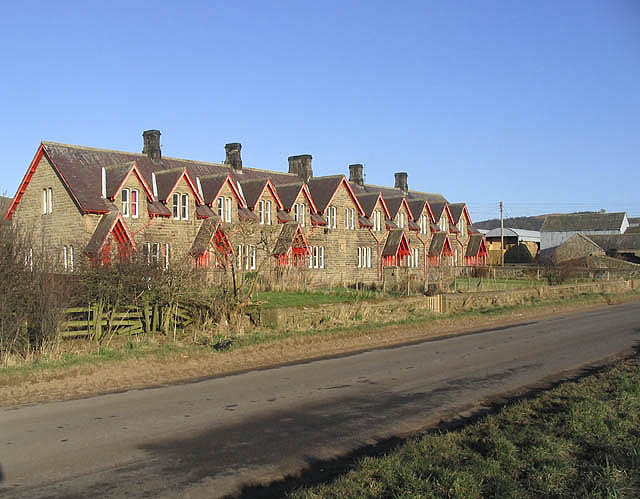
- New Bewick

- Location within Northumberland
- Population: 138 (2011)
- OS grid reference: NU065215
- Civil parish: Bewick
- Unitary authority: Northumberland
- Ceremonial county: Northumberland
- Region: North East
- Country: England
- Sovereign state: United Kingdom
- Post town: ALNWICK
- Postcode district: NE66
- Police: Northumbria
- Fire: Northumberland
- Ambulance: North East
- UK Parliament: Berwick-upon-Tweed

Bewick (/ˈbjuːɪk/) is a civil parish in the county of Northumberland, England. In 2001 it had a population of 69, increasing to 138 (after the inclusion of Chillingham) at the 2011 Census. The parish consists of the hamlets of Old Bewick and New Bewick, both about 10 miles (16 km) north-west of Alnwick. The parish was formed on 1 April 1955 from the parishes of Old Bewick and New Bewick.

== Governance ==
Bewick is in the parliamentary constituency of Berwick-upon-Tweed.
