= Barbara Bailey (artist) =

English Roman Catholic nun & artist

Mary Barbara Bailey CRL (born Barbara Vernon Bailey, 28 June 1910 – 4 May 2003) was an English Roman Catholic nun who illustrated the original "Bunnykins" tableware series which was manufactured by the Doulton & Co. factory. The manufacturing director of the factory was her father, Cuthbert Bailey.

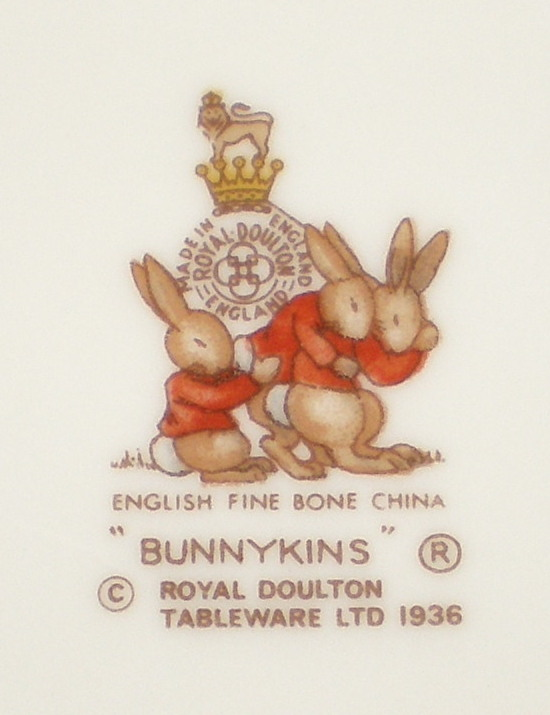
Royal Doulton Bunnykins tableware backstamp

Bailey was born at Bulkeley Hall, Woore, Shropshire, as the second daughter of Cuthbert and Constance Bailey. She made drawings of the surrounding countryside and livestock as well as her six siblings' pets. Brought up in a privileged environment, she had a governess and grew up in a stately home.

In 1933 she became a nun in the Canoness Regular of the Lateran order (who follow the Rule of St. Augustine) and took the name "Sister Mary Barbara". She resided at an enclosed monastery in Sussex and taught French and history at the attached school.

Permission for the project of illustrating Bunnykins tableware for Royal Doulton was granted by the prioress on condition that there be no financial gain from the project for either Bailey or the priory. Bailey stopped illustrating and drawing when her teaching duties made her too busy. Other designers (including Hubert Light, Walter Hayward, Colin Twinn and Frank Endersby) took over the designing process.

Bailey died on 4 May 2003 at Haywards Heath, West Sussex, aged 92.
