= Beswick Pottery =

British ceramics manufacturer

John Beswick Ltd
- Industry: Pottery Manufacturing
- Predecessor: J. W. Beswick
- Founded: 1894; 132 years ago in Longton, Stoke-on-Trent, England
- Founders: James Wright Beswick and sons John and Gilbert
- Defunct: 2002; 24 years ago
- Fate: Brand John Beswick sold to Dartington Crystal (2004)
- Successor: Doulton & Co. Ltd (1969)
- Brands: John Beswick
- Website: http://www.johnbeswick.co.uk/

John Beswick Ltd, formerly J. W. Beswick, was a pottery manufacturer, founded in 1894 by James Wright Beswick and his sons John and Gilbert in Longton, Stoke-on-Trent. In 1969, the business was sold to Doulton & Co. Ltd. The factory closed in 2002 and the brand John Beswick was sold in 2004. The pottery was chiefly known for producing high-quality porcelain figurines such as farm animals and Beatrix Potter characters and have become highly sought in the collectables market.

== History ==
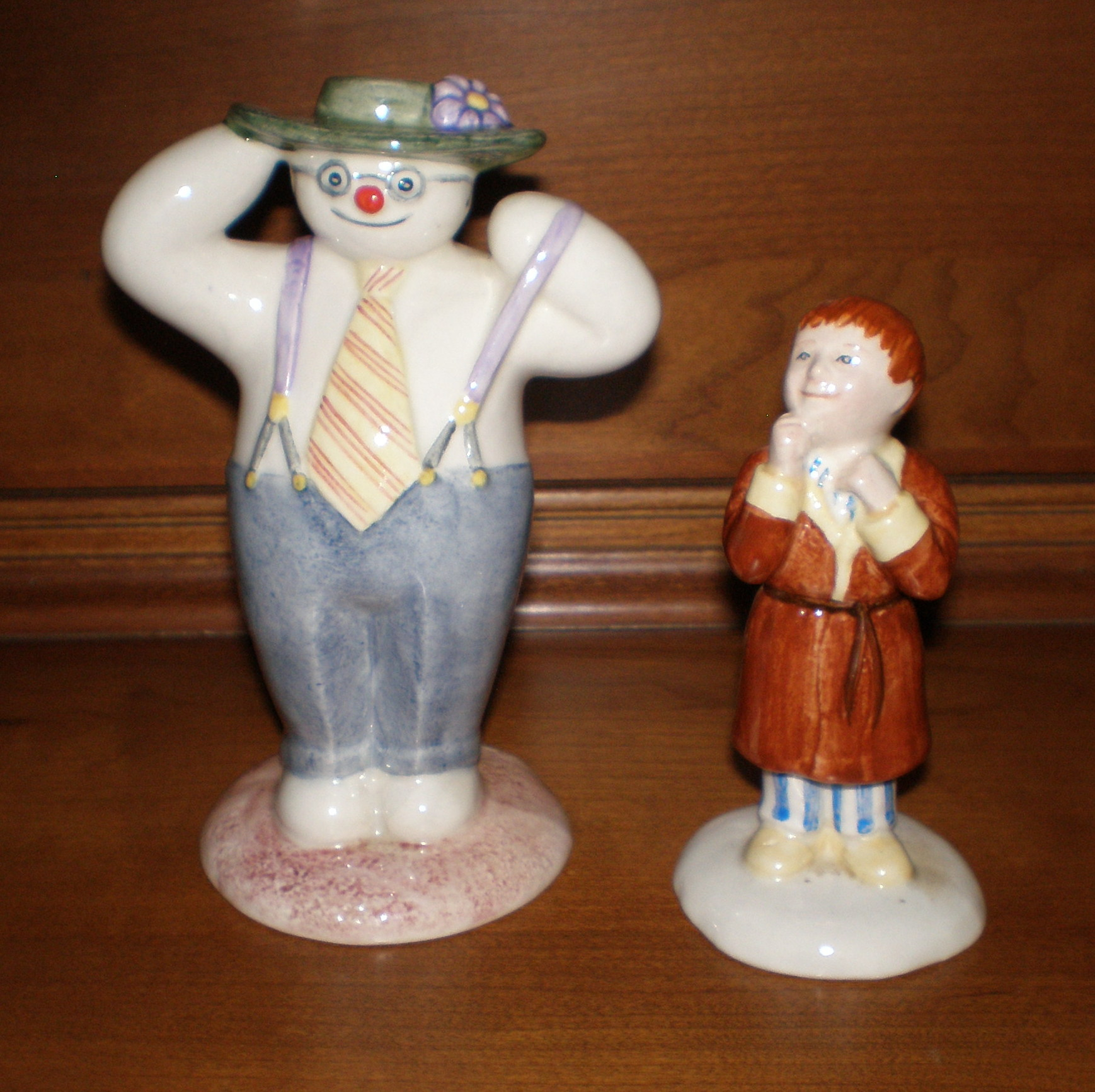
The Snowman and James figurines manufactured by John Beswick Ltd under the Royal Doulton trademark based on characters from the book The Snowman by Raymond Briggs

Based at the Gold Street works in Longton, they originally produced tablewares and ornaments such as Staffordshire cats and dogs. James Wright Beswick died in 1921, but the company continued to expand under his grandson, John Ewart Beswick. In 1934 the introduction of high fired bone china meant they could produce high-quality figurines, such as famous race horses and champion dogs. The company was made a limited company, John Beswick Ltd, in 1936.

In 1939 Arthur Gredington was appointed chief modeller and they began producing farm animal figurines. Arthur Gredington's range of 190 Rearing Horsemen is one of the largest (and most popular amongst collectors) ever produced by the company. Under decorating manager Jim Hayward, there was a shift towards lifelike animal pieces, including cats, dogs, farm animals, fish and wild animals. Continued expansion enabled the acquisition of the adjoining factory in 1945 to accommodate offices, warehousing and new potting and firing facilities.

=== Potter and Disney production ===
In 1947, Lucy Beswick suggested bringing to life the illustrations in the Beatrix Potter books. In 1948, John Beswick secured the right to reproduce a range of 10 Beatrix Potter earthenware characters, the first of which was Jemima Puddle-Duck, modelled by Arthur Gredington. In 1952, Beswick began manufacturing a range of Disney characters, including Snow White, Mickey Mouse and Bambi. Along with the designs of James Hayward, the high-quality pieces they produced have become highly sought.

=== Transfer to Royal Doulton ===
In 1969 Beswick was sold to Doulton & Co. Ltd (Royal Doulton), and although animal figures continued to be produced, by 1989, the Beswick backstamp was dropped in favour of the Royal Doulton Royal Albert DA backstamp.

The popularity of the Beatrix Potter characters was a factor in re-introducing the range in 1998, specifically for the collectors market. By the end of 2002, Royal Doulton ceased production of all Beswick products and in 2003 the Gold Street works were sold off to property developers.

== Continuation of the brand ==
In 2004 the Beswick name and product design rights were sold off. The John Beswick name is now owned by Dartington Crystal, which continue to produce animal figurines; they also produce vases and giftware under the John Beswick name. The Snowman and the Snowdog figures are just some of the nursery figures still being produced.

== See also ==
- Royal Doulton
- List of Bunnykins figurines
