= Archibald Ferguson =

Scottish footballer

Personal information
- Full name: Archibald Ferguson
- Place of birth: Edinburgh, Scotland
- Position: Full back

Senior career*
Years	Team	Apps	(Gls)
1887	Heart of Midlothian		
1888–1891	Derby County	49	(0)
1891	Preston North End	0	(0)
1894	Ardwick	2	(0)
1895	Baltimore Orioles		
- * Club domestic league appearances and goals

Archibald Ferguson was a Scottish footballer who played in the English Football League for Manchester City and Derby County.

Archibald Ferguson' first known football club was Hearts, from where Ferguson was born, Edinburgh. 1887–88 season was the most successful for Hearts since they formed in 1874. The team reached the fourth round of the Scottish Cup. There is no record as to whether Archibald Ferguson played in the Scottish Cup matches. In 1888 Archibald Ferguson was brought down from Scotland before the Football League began to bolster Derby County' defence. He was described as a "no-nonsense" type of defender who had the ability to clear his lines by achieving a long kick of the ball into the opponents half.

Archibald Ferguson made his Club & League debut on 8 September 1888, playing as a full–back, at Pike's Lane, the then home of Bolton Wanderers. Derby County defeated the home team 6–3. Archibald Ferguson appeared in 16 of the 22 League matches played by Derby County in season 1888–89. As a full–back (15 appearances) he played in a Derby County defence that achieved one clean–sheet and restricted the opposition to one–League–goal–in–a–match on four separate occasions.

Ferguson stayed with Derby County for three seasons leaving in 1891. He was signed by Preston North End but never played for them. There was a gap in his career from 1892 until 1894 when he played twice for Ardwick (later to become Manchester City). He left Ardwick and emigrated to USA.
