= George Bakewell =

English footballer

Personal information
- Full name: George Bakewell
- Date of birth: 13 May 1864
- Place of birth: Derby, England
- Date of death: 1928 (aged 63–64)
- Position: Winger

Senior career*
Years	Team	Apps	(Gls)
1883–1884	Derby Midland		
1884–1890	Derby County	49	(9)
1890–1891	Notts County	20	(0)
- * Club domestic league appearances and goals

George Bakewell (13 May 1864 – 1928) was an English footballer who played in the Football League for Derby County and Notts County.

George Bakewell started his playing career at Derby Midland in 1883, just two years after the club was formed. In season 1883–84 Derby Midland made the third round of the FA Cup, the club's greatest achievement.1883–84 FA Cup There is no record of whether Bakewell played in the FA Cup ties in 1883–84 for Derby Midland. George Bakewell, described by contemporaries as a brilliant outside-right, was only the second player signed by Derby County after its formation in 1884. Bakewell was signed from local club Derby Midland and in signing one of Derby Midland' best players this started a pattern of talent poaching that was resented over the years. George Bakewell was "wafer-thin and fast".

George Bakewell made his League debut on 8 September 1888, playing as a winger, at Pike's Lane, the then home of Bolton Wanderers. Derby County defeated the home team 6–3. George Bakewell also scored his debut League goal in this match, in fact, scoring twice. George Bakewell scored the first and second of Derby County' six goals thus securing the permanent honour of being the first Derby County player to score a League goal. George Bakewell appeared in 16 of the 22 League matches played by Derby County in season 1888–89 and scored six goals. As a winger/wing-half (16 appearances) he played in a midfield that achieved big (three–League–goals–or–more) wins on two separate occasions. Of his six League goals two came in one match.

Although Derby County had had a poor season Bakewell was retained to play alongside the more experienced professionals being brought in during the close season in 1889. Bakewell stayed with Derby County for three seasons leaving in 1891. He played 49 games and scored 9 goals. He also played 5 FA Cup ties and scored once. He signed for Notts County in 1891 but only played five times and scored once. He retired from football and became a baker.
