= Walter Roulstone =

English footballer

Personal information
- Full name: Walter Roulstone
- Date of birth: 1866
- Place of birth: Castle Donington, England
- Date of death: 1953 (aged 86–87)
- Position: Left half

Senior career*
Years	Team	Apps	(Gls)
1886–1887	Sawley Rangers		
1888–1894	Derby County	118	(4)
1895	Heanor Town		
1897	Castle Donington F.C.		
1898	Heanor Town		
1898	Castle Donington F.C.		
- * Club domestic league appearances and goals

Walter Roulstone (1866–1953) was an English footballer who played for Derby County.

William Roulstone was signed in 1886 by Sawley Rangers F.C. Very little is known about Sawley Rangers except they were founder members of the Derbyshire Football Association. Albert Williamson was only at Sawley Rangers for one season, 1886–87. Albert Williamson was on Derby County's books for the one season prior to the start of the Football League, 1887–88.

Walter Roulstone made his League debut on 8 September 1888, playing at wing–half, at Pike's Lane, the then home of Bolton Wanderers. Derby County defeated the home team 6–3. Walter Roulstone appeared in 21 of the 22 League matches played by Derby County in season 1888–89. As a wing-half (20 appearances) he played in a midfield that achieved big (three–League–goals–or–more) wins on three occasions.

He was the first player to make 100 league appearances with Derby County. His brother Frank was also a footballer. Although Derby County had had a poor season (1888–89), Roulstone was retained to play alongside the more experienced professionals being brought in during the close season in 1889. Roulstone stayed with Derby County for seven seasons leaving in 1894. He played 118 games becoming the First Derby County player to play 100 games for the club. He went to local non-league club Heanor Town in 1895.
