= Lewis Cooper =

English footballer

Personal information
- Full name: Lewis Cooper
- Date of birth: Q4 1864
- Place of birth: Belper, England
- Date of death: 12 February 1937
- Position: Forward

Senior career*
Years	Team	Apps	(Gls)
1885	Darley Dale F.C.		
1886	Derby County		
1887	Grimsby Town		
1888–1891	Derby County	50	(23)
- * Club domestic league appearances and goals

Lewis Cooper was an English footballer who played in The Football League for Derby County.

== Playing career ==
Lewis Cooper began his playing career at Darley Dale F.C., a club based in the Peak District, in 1885. In 1886 he moved on, signing for Derby County and playing one of the last two seasons of the pre Football League era for Derby County, 1886–87. He then moved across to Lincolnshire, and signed for Grimsby Town. In season 1887–88 Grimsby Town reached the fourth round of the FA Cup for the second time since the club was formed. In June 1888 Cooper returned to Derbyshire and re-signed for Derby County.

Lewis Cooper made his League debut on 8 September 1888, playing as a forward, at Pike's Lane, the then home of Bolton Wanderers. Derby County defeated the home team 6–3. Lewis Cooper also scored his debut League goal in this match, in fact, scoring twice. Lewis Cooper scored the third and fifth of Derby County' six goals. Lewis Cooper appeared in 15 of the 22 League matches played by Derby County in season 1888–89 and scored eight goals. As a forward (nine appearances) he played in a forward–line that scored three–League–goals–or–more on four separate occasions. As a winger (six appearances) he played in a midfield that achieved big (three–League–goals–or–more) wins once Of his eight League goals four were scored in two matches, two–in–a–match in two appearances.

Although Derby County had had a poor season Cooper was retained to play alongside the more experienced professionals being brought in during the close season in 1889. Cooper stayed with Derby County for four seasons leaving in 1892. He played 50 games and scored 23 goals. He also played 4 FA Cup ties and scored three times. Lewis Cooper was nicknamed "Kid" Cooper and when he ceased playing he worked at Haslam's Foundry for more than 50 years.
