= Harbor (disambiguation) =

A harbor (or harbour) is a place where ships may shelter from the weather or are stored.

Harbo(u)r or The Harbo(u)r may also refer to:

== Arts and entertainment ==
- Harbor (America album), 1977
- Harbor (Marc Douglas Berardo album) or the title song, 2005
- Harbour (novel), a 2008 novel by John Ajvide Lindqvist
- Harbour (painting), an 1881 oil painting by Joaquín Sorolla

== Companies and organizations ==
- Harbor Airlines, a defunct American commuter airline
- Harbour Air Seaplanes, a Canadian charter airline
- Harbour Group, a Washington, D.C., advocacy group
- Harbour Productions Unlimited, an American television production company

== People ==
- David Harbour (born 1975), American actor
- William Harbour (disambiguation), several people

== Places and structures ==
- Los Angeles Harbor Region, California, US
- Harbor, Oregon, US
- Harbor Towers, two residential towers in Boston, Massachusetts, US
- Harbor Transitway, a roadway in Interstate Highway 110 in Los Angeles County, California, US
- Harbour (state assembly constituency), a constituency of Tamil Nadu, India
- Harbour Islets, Tasmania, Australia
- The Harbour (hospital), a mental health hospital in Blackpool, Lancashire, England

== Other uses ==
- Harbour (horse) (1979–1985), a French Thoroughbred racehorse
- Harbour (programming language), an xBase language

== See also ==
- Grand Harbour (disambiguation)
- Harbor station (disambiguation)
- Harbour Bridge (disambiguation)
- Harbour City (disambiguation)
- Harbour Island (disambiguation)
- Harbour View (disambiguation)
