= William Harbour =

William Harbour may refer to:

- William Harbour (priest), archdeacon of Southland, New Zealand
- William Harbour (footballer) (1869–1928), English footballer
- William E. Harbour (1942–2020), American civil rights activist
- J. William Harbour, American ophthalmologist, ocular oncologist and cancer researcher
