= Harbor Center =

Harbour Centre is a building in Vancouver, British Columbia, Canada

Harbour Centre, Harbor Center or similar may refer to:

- HarborCenter, a hockey-themed mixed-use development in Buffalo, New York, United States
- Harbor Centre, the downtown and marina district of Sheboygan, Wisconsin
- Harbor–UCLA Medical Center, a hospital in Torrance, California, USA (Los Angeles metropolitan area)
- Harbor Gateway Transit Center, train and bus station in Harbor Gateway, Los Angeles, California
- Harbour Centre (海港中心), a skyscraper in Wan Chai, Hong Kong
- Harbour Centre Development, hotel and restaurant company in Hong Kong
- Harbour Place Shopping Centre, shopping mall in Mulligar, Ireland
- Harbor City Recreation Center, in Harbor City, Los Angeles, United States

== See also ==
- Centre Harbor Village Historic District, in Center Harbor, New Hampshire, USA
- Center Harbor, New Hampshire, USA
- Harbour Town
- Harbour City (disambiguation)
- Harbour Station, an arena in Canada
