= Hotel Victoria =

Hotel Victoria may refer to:

- Hotel Victoria (New York City)
- Hotel Victoria (Toronto)
