= Grand Harbour (disambiguation) =

The Grand Harbour is a natural harbour on the island of Malta.

Grand Harbour or Grand Harbor may also refer to:

- Grand Harbour (Toronto), a condominium community in Ontario, Canada
- Grand Harbour, New Brunswick, a community on Grand Manan Island, Canada
- Grand Harbor Resort and Waterpark, Dubuque, Iowa, United States

== See also ==
- Grand Harbor Press, an imprint of Amazon Publishing
- Harbor (disambiguation)
