= Harbour View =

Harbour View may refer to:

- Harbour View, Jamaica, a community at the eastern extreme of the city of Kingston, Jamaica
- Harbour View, New Zealand, a suburb of Lower Hutt, New Zealand
- Harbour View Elementary School, a public school on the north end of Dartmouth, Nova Scotia, Canada
- Harbour View High School, a high school located in Saint John, New Brunswick
- Harbour View F.C., a Jamaican football club that currently plays in the Digicel Premier League
  - Harbour View Stadium, the home stadium of Harbour View F.C.
