= Grand Harbour (Toronto) =

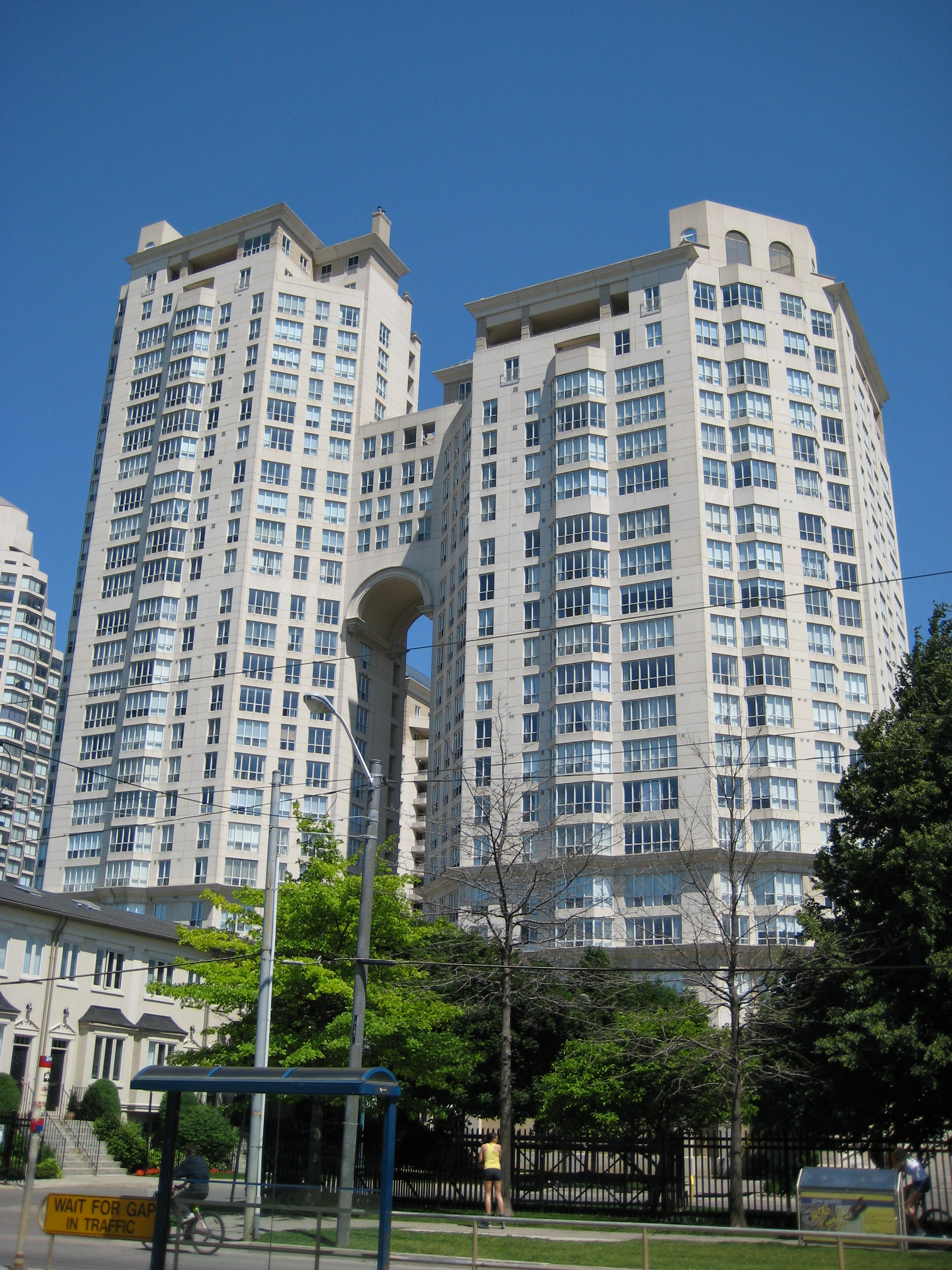

- Location within Toronto

General information
- Type: Condominium
- Location: 2285 Lake Shore Boulevard West; Toronto, Ontario, Canada
- Coordinates: 43.618707°N 79.485204°W
- Construction started: 1989
- Completed: 1992

Height
- Roof: 259 m (850 ft)

Technical details
- Floor count: 17

Design and construction
- Architects: Larry Boland and Richard Weldon
- Developer: Rymark Development Ltd.

Website
- www.grandharbourcondos.ca/view/home.aspx

Grand Harbour is a lakefront condominium community in the Etobicoke district of Toronto, Ontario, Canada. It consists of three condominium towers and several dozen townhouses. Grand Harbour is located on the shore of Lake Ontario just west of Humber Bay Park and Mimico Creek.

The site was originally home to the Mimico Motor Hotel and the Westpoint Motel and Restaurant, two of the many motels along the Lakeshore strip that became a prominent landmark in the 1950s due to the prominent advertising of the motels competing for travellers on the main highway west of Toronto. Beginning in the 1960s, Highway 401 rose to become the primary east-west route and the motel strip lost business, eventually becoming best known for its somewhat seedy side. In 1988, at the height of a property boom, the prime waterfront real estate was purchased by Rylar Development Ltd for $15.5 million.

Larry Boland and Richard Weldon, principals of Rylar, opted to build a set of luxury condominiums designed by Matsui Baer Vanstone. They opted for a distinctly Neo-Eclectic and Postmodern style. Christopher Hume, architecture critic for the Toronto Star, described it as "a hybrid of classical, neo-gothic, and Georgian...mixed together and applied - incongruously but felicitously - to 20th-century-sized structures." Its most striking feature is the 14-storey archway that connects the two tallest towers.

Buildings containing a pastiche of historical styles were at their most popular in the late 1980s an early 1990s, but that coincided with a sharp downturn in the Toronto real estate market that saw few buildings erected. Thus the Grand Harbour is one of only a few such condo towers in Toronto from that era. The early 2000s saw more such towers built, but the style had declined as New Modernism became more mainstream. One other example from its era is the Flatiron-shaped 25 The Esplanade, also designed by Matsui Baer Vanstone. The entire project consists of three towers, the tallest being 27 storeys. It is connected by the archway to the shorter 20-storey tower. These buildings contain 276 units, while a third 17-storey tower contains 109 units. At ground level there are 55 townhouses.

The original sales went well, and construction began with some 80 per cent of the units sold. However, the recession caused many buyers to abandon the project and the remaining inventory could not be sold. Construction continued, and the complex was completed in 1991. But Rymark was unable to finance the project; banks and court-appointed receivers took control of it in 1994.
