= 25 The Esplanade =

Mixed-use building in Toronto, completed 1988

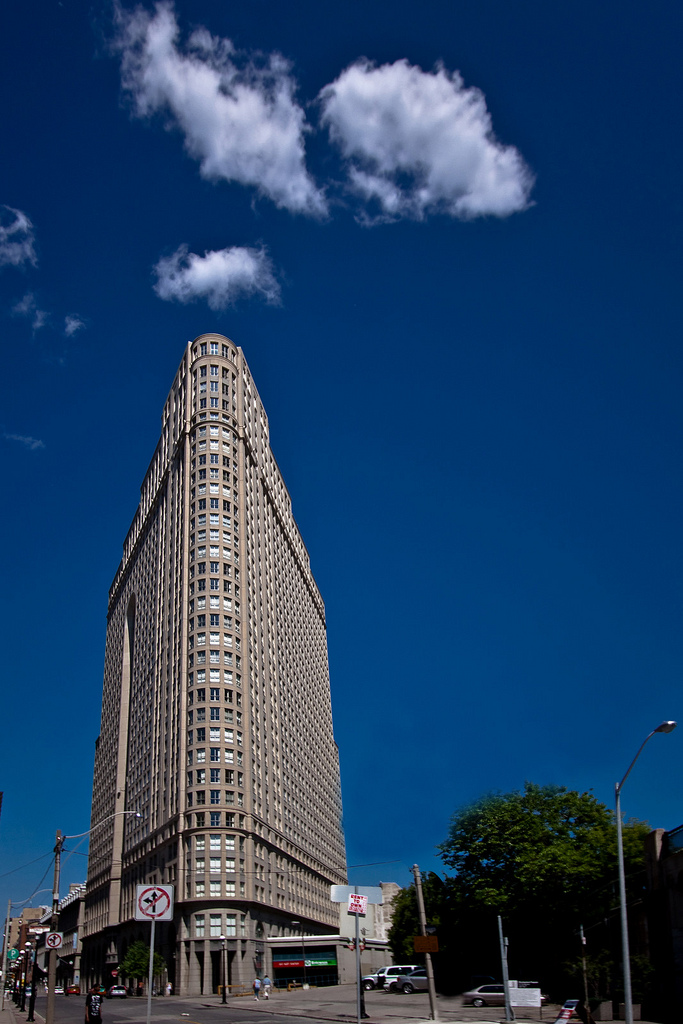
- Interactive map of the 25 The Esplanade area
- Alternative names: 35 The Esplanade

General information
- Status: Completed
- Type: Residential Condominiums, Commercial Offices, Retail
- Location: Toronto, Ontario, Canada, 25 The Esplanade, 35 The Esplanade
- Coordinates: 43°38′47″N 79°22′30″W
- Construction started: 1986
- Completed: 1988
- Opened: 1989
- Owner: Metro Toronto Condominium Corporation # 850, Silver Hotel Group

Height
- Height: 108 metres

Technical details
- Floor count: 33 floors

Design and construction
- Architect: Matsui Baer Vanstone Architects
- Developer: Avro Group

Other information
- Number of stores: 3
- Number of units: 571 condo units
- Parking: 3 floors underground

Website
- https://25theesplanade.ca/

25 The Esplanade is a primarily residential condominium, mixed-use high-rise building in Downtown Toronto (in the St. Lawrence neighbourhood), Ontario, Canada. It has condominium, office and retail space. It also has hotel space at Novotel Toronto Centre. The building is "Reminiscent of New York's famed Flatiron Building".

== Description ==
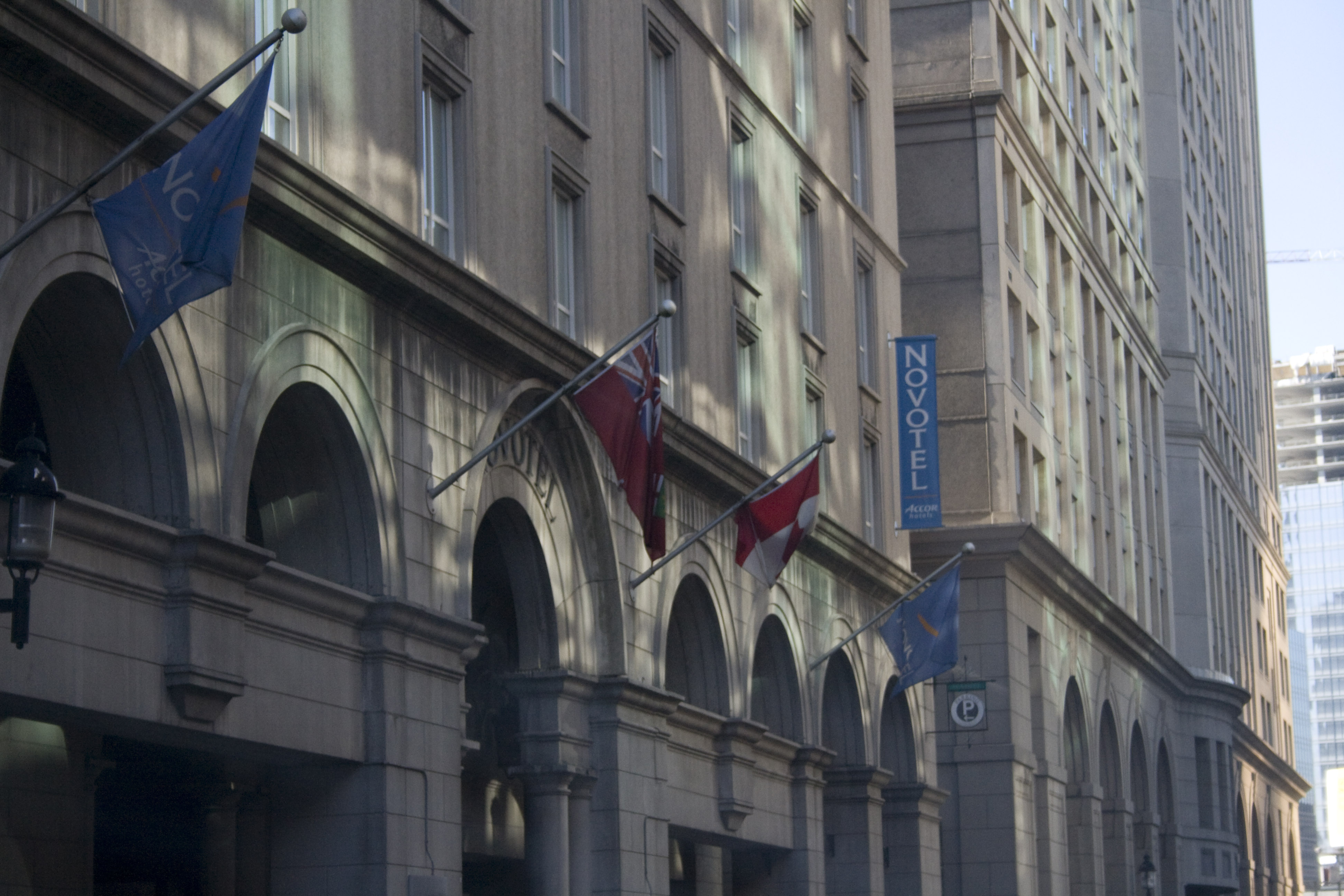
The colonnade of Novotel Toronto Centre and 25 The Esplanade

The building stands at 33 floors, and at approximately 108 metres. It has 571 condominium units, throughout floors 3 to 32, and amenities for condominium residents on its 33rd floor. The second floor has 17,578 sq. ft. of office space, under a separate address of 35 The Esplanade. The first floor is mainly retail space, which contains 7,403 sq. ft. of useable retail space. The Novotel Toronto Centre, at 45 The Esplanade, has 262 hotel rooms, and a restaurant at its base.

== History ==
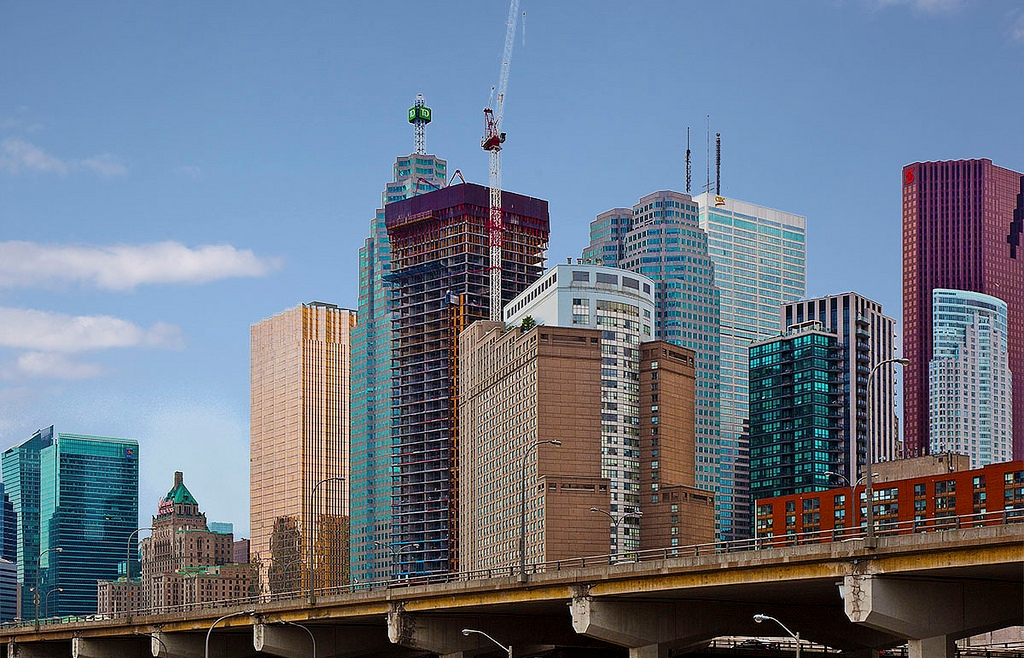
Downtown Toronto, with 25 The Esplanade in view

Construction, by the Avro Group, started in 1986. The building was designed by Matsui Baer Vanstone Architects. The building topped out in 1988, and was finished by 1989. The building was also built together with Novotel Toronto Centre, a 9-story hotel, developed and built by the same companies, which broke ground at the same time with 25 The Esplanade. The two buildings are connected by the underground parking garage, three storeys underground. The consulting engineer for the structure was Rybka, Smith, & Ginsler. The construction company was Avro Construction Inc. (under Avro Group) At the time of its completion, 25 The Esplanade was the largest condominium building in Canada, with 571 units in one tower. By the 1990s, it was the 2nd largest condominium in North America.

== Design ==
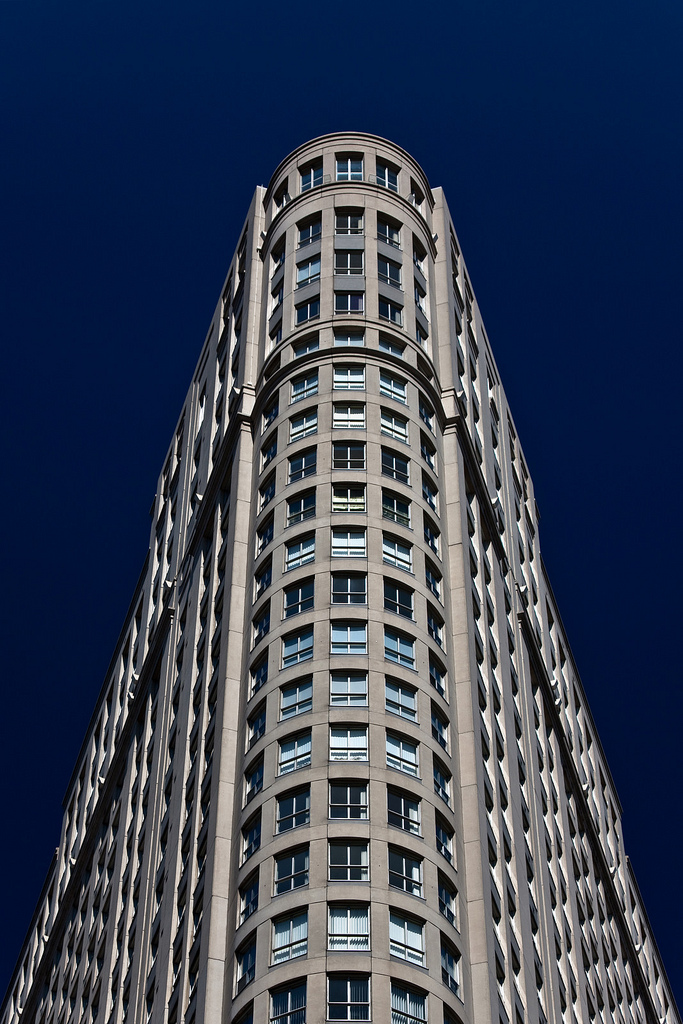
25 The Esplanade

Both 25 The Esplanade and Novotel Toronto Centre share a similar design, with a colonnade stretching both buildings with building entrances and retail spaces. The architectural style of 25 The Esplanade is often described as postmodern, with references to Art Deco and Beaux-Arts.

== Ownership and management ==
As of 2022, the commercial portion of 25 The Esplanade (35 The Esplanade), Novotel Toronto Centre, and the parking lot were owned by Silver Hotel Group. They were originally owned by Avro Group. As of 2024, the condominium was managed by MTCC#850.

== Amenities ==
25 The Esplanade includes various amenities for its condominium residents.

On the 33rd floor, amenities include a gym, party room / lounge area, kitchen, games room, sauna, whirlpool, and 2 terraces, each facing North and South. On the 32nd and 31st floors are extra terraces on the North and South sides, totalling 6 terraces throughout floors 33, 32, and 31. The 32nd floor includes a meeting room. On the 6th floor, is the “SkyPark”, a half-acre terrace on top of the adjacent city-owned Green P parking garage. The SkyPark includes 6 barbecues, a children’s play area, and seating.

== Tenants ==
Notable tenants for the offices at 35 The Esplanade include Kaplan International, a language school located in suite 250, and TTI Travel, a travel agency, located within suite 200.

As for retail, Clutch Market, a convenience store is located on the ground floor, along with Postal Station A, and Esplanade Cleaners, a dry cleaning service.

Over at Novotel Toronto Centre, Café Nicole, a restaurant, is located on the ground floor.

== Redevelopment plans ==
As of 2025, the Novotel Toronto Centre, at 45 The Esplanade, is planned to be demolished by Silver Hotel Group, the owners, and Republic Developments, and replaced by a single 39 story condominium tower, with a seven story podium which will house 141 hotel rooms, and replace the current 262 hotel rooms. The condominium will house 726 units. The new building is designed by Arcadis. The original proposal called for two condominium towers, each 36 stories tall, and a seven story podium with hotel rooms. This proposal will remove the Novotel’s half of the colonnade, which sparked a petition to retain the building’s facade.

== Media coverage ==
In 2017, the Toronto Life magazine published an article titled “The Big Brood” as part of their 4 kid-friendly condos. The article showcased families living in the condo building. “There’s an enormous terrace on the sixth floor where grade schoolers put finishing touches on snowmen in winter and ride bikes or dig around in a sandbox in the summer.”

In February 2021, amidst the COVID-19 pandemic, the City of Toronto leased the Novotel Toronto Centre, located at 45 The Esplanade (adjacent to 25 The Esplanade), for $766,800 per month to operate as a temporary homeless shelter. Other nearby hotels, such as Hotel Victoria, Strathcona Hotel (now Union Hotel, also owned by Silver Hotel Group), and several others, were also turned into homeless shelters around this time. Before this, another homeless shelter in the area operated at 98 The Esplanade, which closed earlier. The hotel, a four-star establishment, was converted to house approximately 260 individuals experiencing homelessness, with services provided by the Homes First Society.

The presence of the temporary shelter generated significant media coverage and became a source of controversy within the St. Lawrence Market neighborhood. Residents and local businesses voiced concerns about an increase in issues such as discarded needles, human waste, public intoxication, disturbances, and perceived increases in crime in the immediate vicinity. Photos and videos purportedly showing vandalized rooms within the hotel and issues outside the property circulated online.

The City of Toronto initially extended the lease for the shelter multiple times. However, in October 2022, it was announced that the Novotel would cease operations as a shelter by the end of 2022, with the property owner intending to resume regular hotel operations in 2023, and the city paying for renovations for the hotel. The closure led to further media attention, with concerns raised by housing advocates and residents about the relocation plans for the individuals housed there, particularly as winter approached. The city stated it was working to relocate residents to permanent housing or other shelters. The Novotel officially closed as a shelter in early December 2022 and underwent renovations by the city before reopening as a hotel. The hotel reopened in May of 2023.

On April 2, 2022, Toronto Police arrested a 29-year-old man, Devante Moores, in the building's underground parking lot and seized 50 kilograms of powdered cocaine. Following this arrest, a warranted search of a unit within 25 The Esplanade (which police believed to be a stash house), the suspect's residence, and a vehicle led to the discovery of an additional 139 kilograms of cocaine and 97 kilograms of crystal methamphetamines, along with $50,000 in cash. This seizure, totalling over 280 kilograms of illicit drugs with an estimated street value of $28.5 million, was announced by Toronto Police on April 14, 2022, and was the largest single-day drug seizure in the history of the Toronto Police Service at the time. Inspector Mandeep Mann stated that police believed the unit was used to store and distribute drugs to local neighborhoods and surrounding communities. The vehicle was fitted with “professionally-built trap more than likely used to transport large amounts of drugs and very likely firearms.”, “We believe that stash-house was used to house these drugs and distribute to our local neighbourhoods and our surrounding communities,” Mann said.
