= William Harbour (priest) =

New Zealand Anglican cleric

William Leslie Scott Harbour was the Archdeacon of Southland from 1966 until 1977.

Harbour was educated at the University of New Zealand and ordained deacon in 1935 and priest in 1937. After a curacy at All Saints' Church, Dunedin he held incumbencies at Winton, Anderson's Bay and Invercargill until his appointment as Archdeacon.
