= Harbour Island =

Harbour Island or Harbor Island may refer to:

== Harbor Island ==
- Harbor Island, Newport Beach, California, US
- Harbor Island, San Diego, California, US
- Harbor Island, Phippsburg, Maine, US
- Harbor Island National Wildlife Refuge, Potagannissing Bay, Michigan, US
- Harbor Island, at Grand Haven, Michigan, US
- Harbor Island, at Wrightsville Beach, North Carolina, US
- Harbor Island, South Carolina, Beaufort County, South Carolina, US
- Harbor Island, Seattle, Washington, US

== Harbour Island ==
- Harbour Island, Bahamas
- Harbour Island (Little Bay Islands), Newfoundland and Labrador, Canada
- Harbour Island (Ramea Islands), Newfoundland and Labrador, Canada
- Harbour Island (Tampa), Florida, US

== See also ==
- Coaster's Harbor Island, Narragansett Bay, Newport, Rhode Island, US
- North Harbour Island, Lake Erie, Ontario, Canada
