= William Harbour (footballer) =

English footballer

Personal information
- Date of birth: Q4 1869
- Place of birth: Liverpool, England
- Date of death: 1928
- Position: Right half

Senior career*
Years	Team	Apps	(Gls)
1888	Everton		
1888	Derby County	1	(0)
- * Club domestic league appearances and goals

William Harbour (1869 – 1928) was an English footballer who played in the Football League as a right half for Derby County although an Everton.

Albert Williamson had established himself as the Derby County right-half. However, on 27 October 1888, when Derby County visited Anfield, Liverpool to play Everton they did not come with sufficient players. Arthur Latham, the Derby County right-back, was one of those missing and so Derby County moved Albert Williamson to right-back and was replaced at right-half by Everton player William Harbour.

Derby County shocked Everton by taking the lead but Everton took over and established a 3-1 lead at half-time. Apparently Joseph Marshall was heroic in the Derby County goal but despite many "fine saves", Everton were 6-1 up as the game towards its end. Derby County got a consolation goal to make the final score 6-2. William Harbour played in one League match in 1888-1889 which was played at right-half. Derby County finished 10th in the Football League scoring 41 goals and conceding 61 goals in 22 games, the latter being the third worst defence of the season.

William Harbour, although an Everton player played his only League appearance for Derby County and after he played for Derby County against his ow club he disappeared from the football radar.
