= Harbour (painting) =

1881 painting by Joaquín Sorolla

- Marina (Spanish)
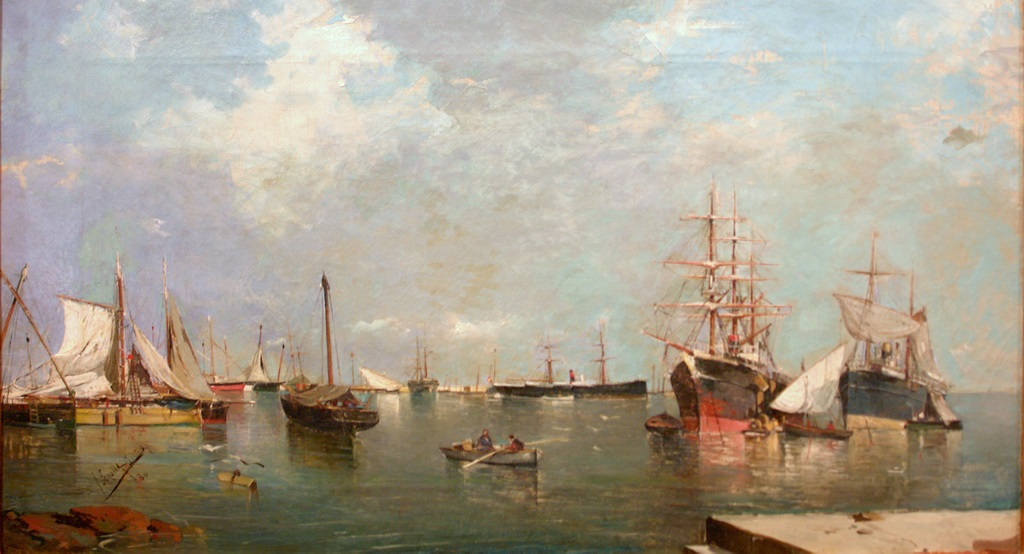
- Artist: Joaquín Sorolla
- Year: 1881
- Medium: oil on canvas
- Dimensions: 44.50 cm × 78 cm (17.52 in × 31 in)
- Location: Sorolla Museum, Madrid

Harbour or Seascape (Spanish - Marina) is a small 1881 oil-on-canvas painting by the Spanish artist Joaquín Sorolla. He painted it early in his career. It is now in the Sorolla Museum in Madrid.

It follows the Spanish academic style of the late 19th century, influenced by the central European post-romantic tradition of seascapes and by the Valencian pilot, archaeologist and painter Rafael Monleón y Torres.
