= Harbour View Elementary School =

Elementary school

Coordinates: 44°40′53.1″N 63°35′22.9″W

Harbour View Elementary School, also called "Harbour View School", is a public school located in the Tufts Cove neighbourhood of north-end Dartmouth, serving about 380 children from pre-primary through to sixth grade. The school's preschool program, student services offices, and dental clinic are in the building. The principal is Fournier, Dan. Harbour View Elementary School has a bee as a mascot, with a celebration held every month at their "Super Bee Assembly"; this celebrates all the wonderful things happening within the school that month. Harbour View also boasts a range of clubs and activities: knitting club, skipping club, art club, gardening club, and a basketball team "The Harbour View Hornets". Harbour View has an active Breakfast Program and provides hot lunch three days a week, and snacks the other two. This program has been in place for over two decades.

== History ==
The school was first built in 1945, with major construction work also taking place in 1972.

In 1997 and 1998, the school was among 25 taking part in the Nova Scotia Model Schools Program, in which trees and other greenery were planted on school grounds. In recent years, Harbour View has grown exponentially, blooming from approcimately 175 students to 380 in about five years. Harbour View Elementary School has an active gardening club, and helps maintain a community garden that is on the property.

== School Makeup ==
Historically, a significant proportion of the student population lived in poverty. The neighbourhood welcomes many newcomers to Canada and has a large African Nova Scotian community. This makes for a diverse school population. With the recent population growth in Nova Scotia, many schools are full. Halifax Regional Centre for Education stated that by October 2024, "Our enrollment will likely surpass 60,000". This makes for fuller classrooms within the schools.

Harbour View Elementary School and John MacNeil Elementary School both feed into John Martin Junior High School.
