= Harbour City =

Harbour City may refer to:

- Harbour City (Hong Kong), a shopping centre
- Harbor City, Los Angeles, the community in Los Angeles
- Harbour City tram stop, a tram stop in Greater Manchester
- Kaohsiung, nicknamed "the harbour city" for having the biggest port in Taiwan
- Nanaimo, British Columbia, officially called "The Harbour City"
- Sydney, nicknamed "the Harbour City"
- Harbor City Capital, a Florida-based alternative investment firm employing George Santos during 2020–2021

== See also ==
- Harbour Town
- Harbor Town
- Harbour Centre
