= Hotel Victoria (Toronto) =

Historic boutique hotel in Toronto, Ontario

Coordinates: 43.6482°N 79.3774°W

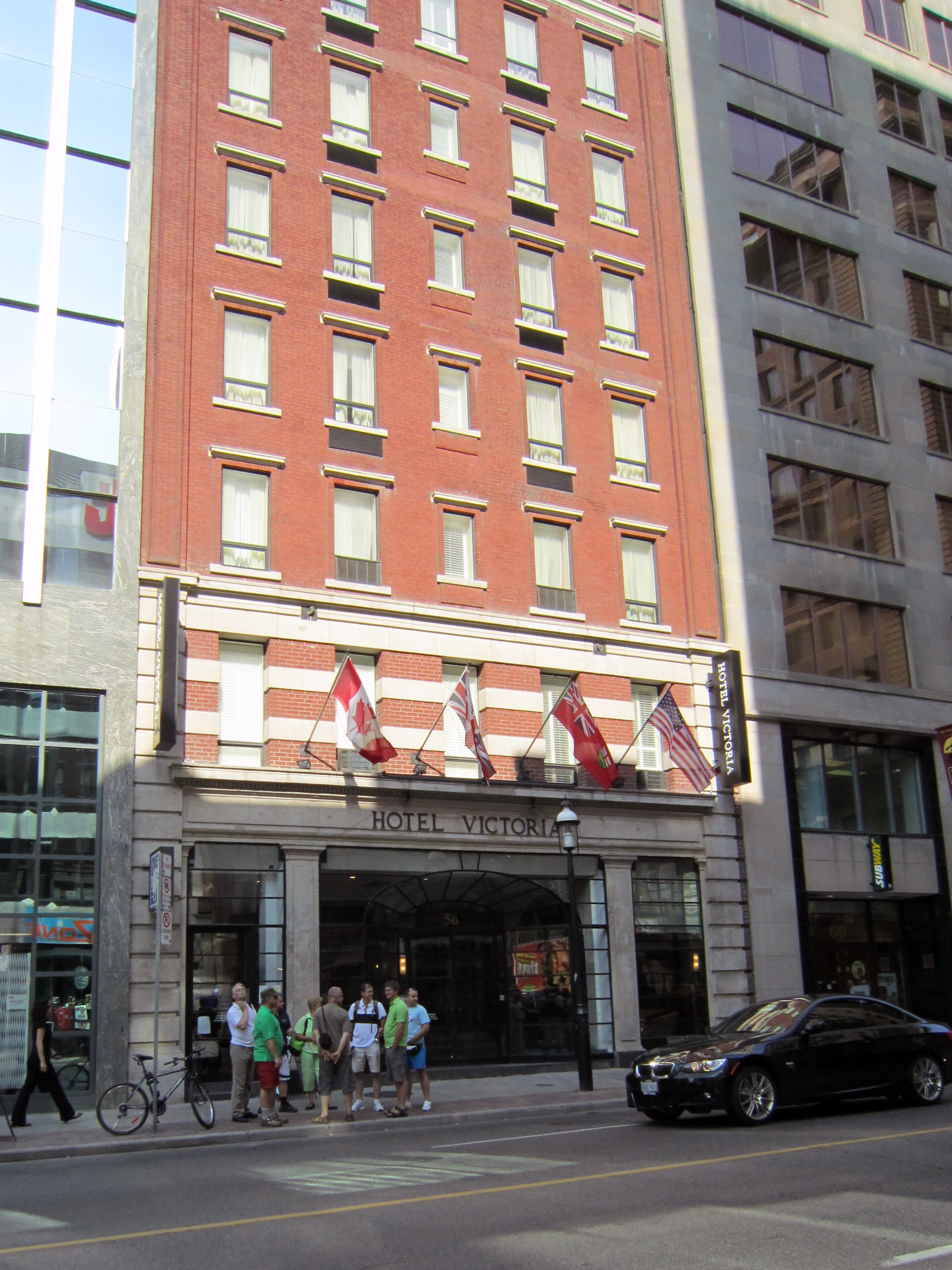
- Interactive map of the Hotel Victoria area
- Former names: Hotel Mossop

General information
- Location: 56 Yonge Street, Toronto, Ontario, Canada
- Opened: 1909
- Cost: $250,000
- Owner: QuadReal Property Group

Technical details
- Floor count: 8

Design and construction
- Architect: J.P. Hynes

Other information
- Number of rooms: 56
- Number of restaurants: 1

Website
- www.hotelvictoria-toronto.com

Hotel Victoria is a historic boutique hotel located at 56 Yonge Street in Toronto, Ontario, Canada. The hotel opened in 1909 as the Hotel Mossop and was celebrated for being a fireproof building, constructed after Toronto's Great Fire of 1904. It has been designated a Heritage Building by the City of Toronto government.

== Great Fire of Toronto and initial construction ==
The hotel was built after Toronto's Great Fire of 1904, which destroyed over 100 buildings in downtown Toronto and caused over $10 million worth of damage. Following the fire, in 1906, Frederick Mossop, a former hotel clerk, purchased the site at 56 Yonge Street with the intention of building a hotel.

Mossop hired Canadian architect J.P. Hynes to design the building, which was intended from the outset to be completely fireproof. After three years of planning and construction, the 48-room, eight-storey hotel was finished at a cost of $250,000. Upon completion, Mossop named the hotel after himself, and it opened in 1909 as the Hotel Mossop.

== Construction and architecture ==
The hotel was noted for its fireproof construction, efficient site planning, and its Canadian design and materials.

=== Fireproof construction ===
The respected journal Construction called the Hotel Mossop "one of the most thoroughly constructed fireproof buildings in the Dominion", and drew attention to several unique features of its construction:

[The Mossop] stands on a foundation of eighteen concrete wells running down to bed rock, the first foundation of its kind installed in Toronto. All the steel work is fully protected at every point by a non-combustible material: the stairways are of iron with slate treads; the elevators are enclosed in the most approved manner; and the doors and windows throughout are of metal and metal sash with extra heavy fireproof glass.

=== Site planning ===
Hynes also faced the "most difficult problem" of "erecting the hotel on an extremely narrow site", which was only 40 feet in width and 112 feet in depth. Despite this significant constraint, Construction remarked that there was "not…the slightest semblance of crowding…in the arrangement of the entire interior scheme," and that the space had been "so advantageously utilized that the rooms…[were] of generous dimensions."

=== Canadian design and materials ===
It was noted that in "design, and in the materials employed", the Hotel Mossop was "mainly a Canadian product". Hynes, who would later go on to serve as president of Architecture Canada in 1926, was praised for the exterior design of the building, which was noted for its "pleasing expression", derived from simple straight lines rather than "exuberance of decorative detail":

The façade is of red pressed brick with cut stone piers and belt courses up to the third floor, and finished at the top story with arched opening which agreeably relieves the otherwise somewhat rigid and austere treatment of the windows.

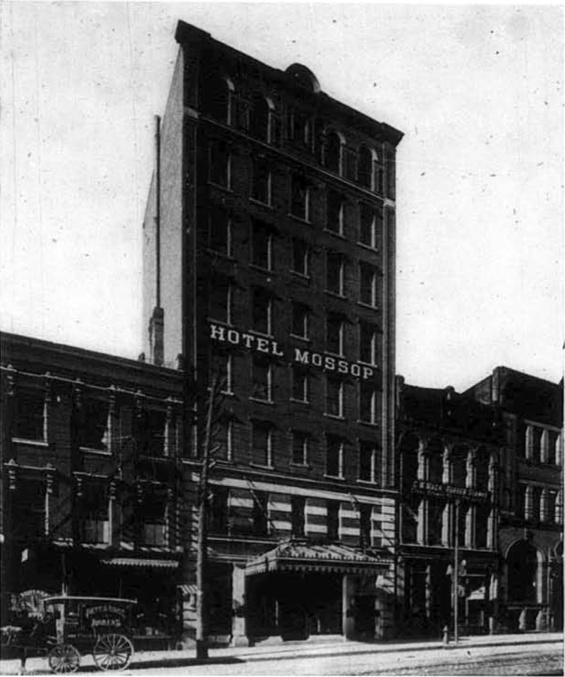
Hotel Mossop (1909)

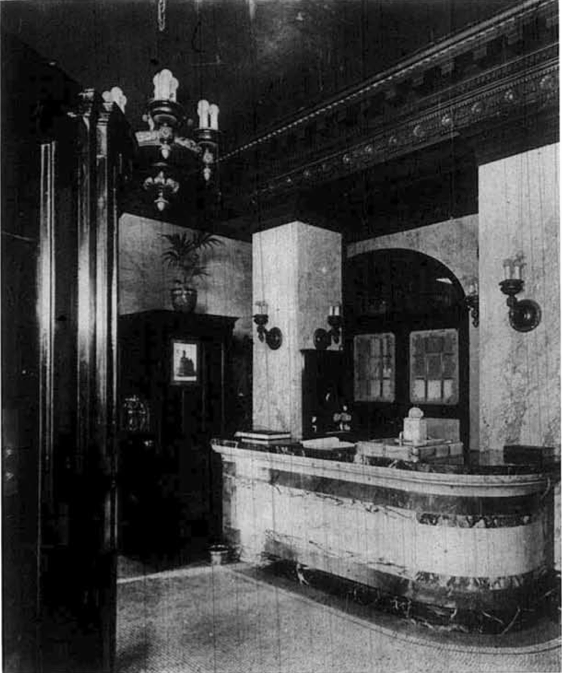
Lobby of the Hotel Mossop (1909)

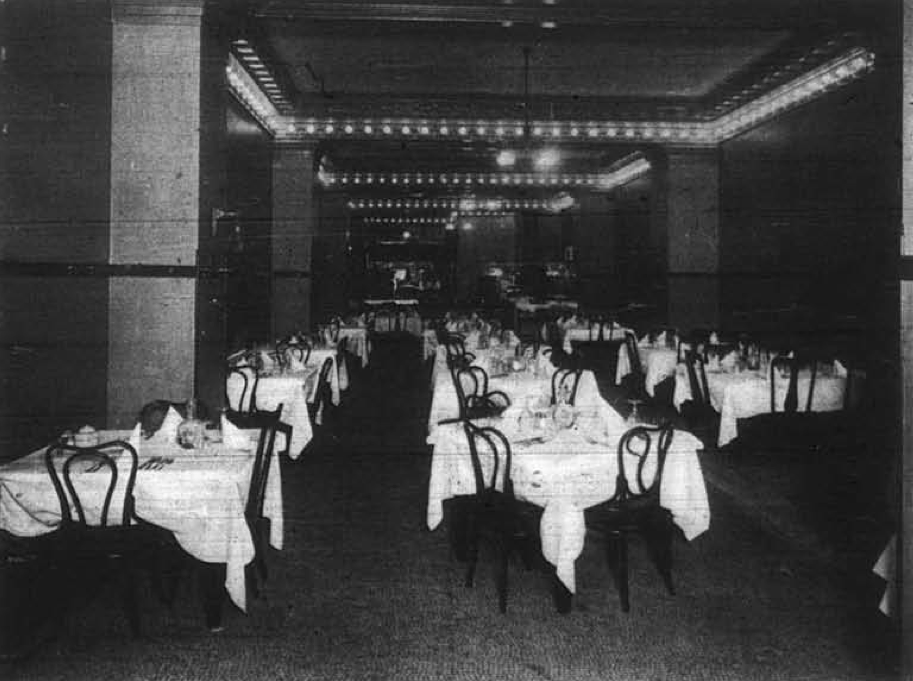
The Grill Room (1909)

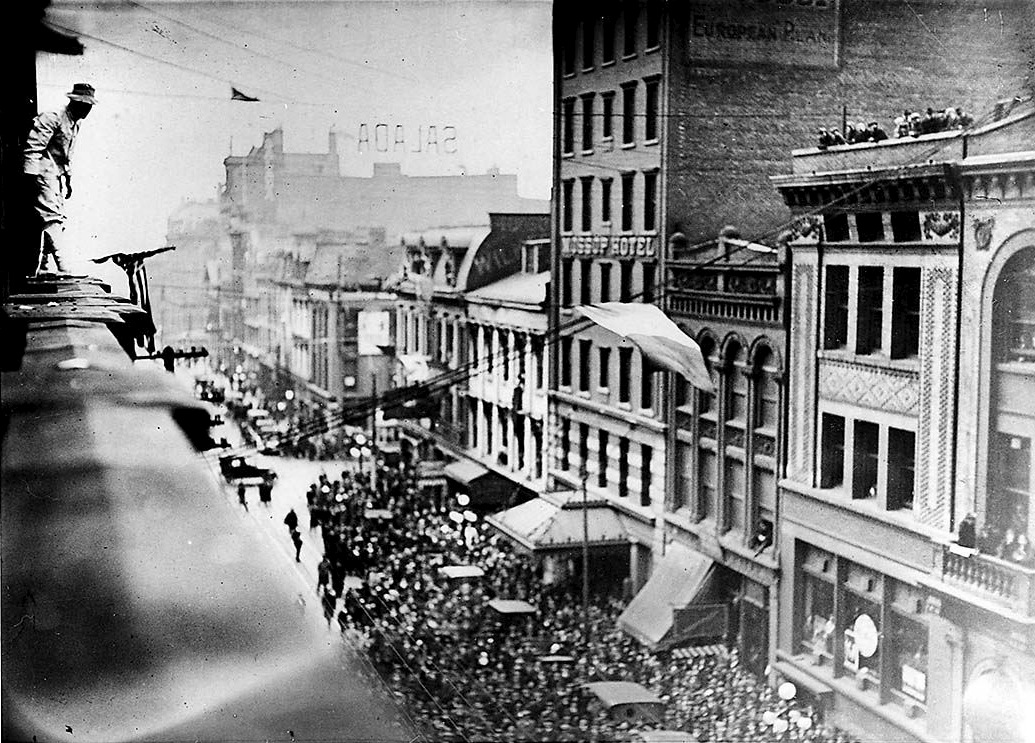
The "Human Fly" entertains a crowd in front of the Hotel Mossop

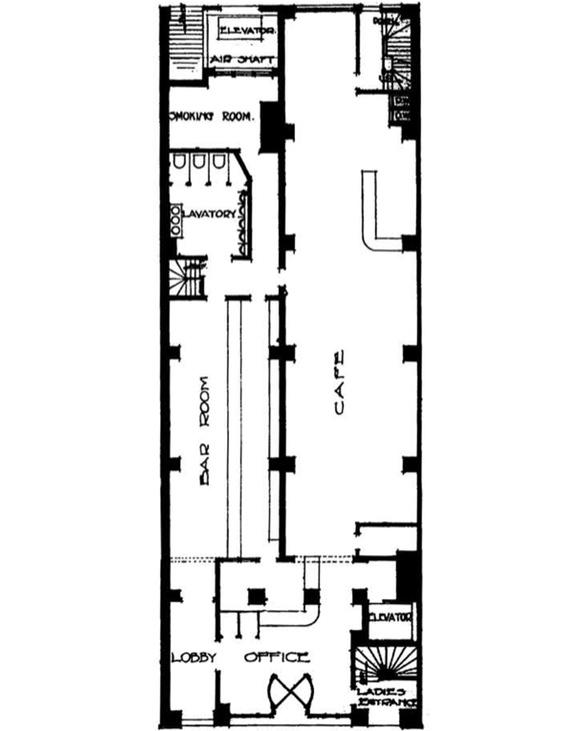
Ground Floor Plan (1909)

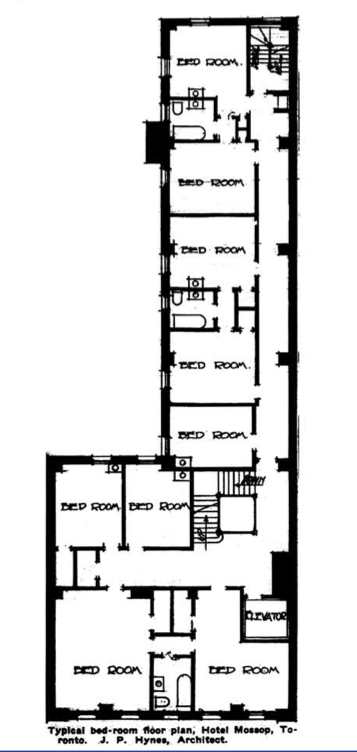
Floorplan for a Typical Floor (1909)

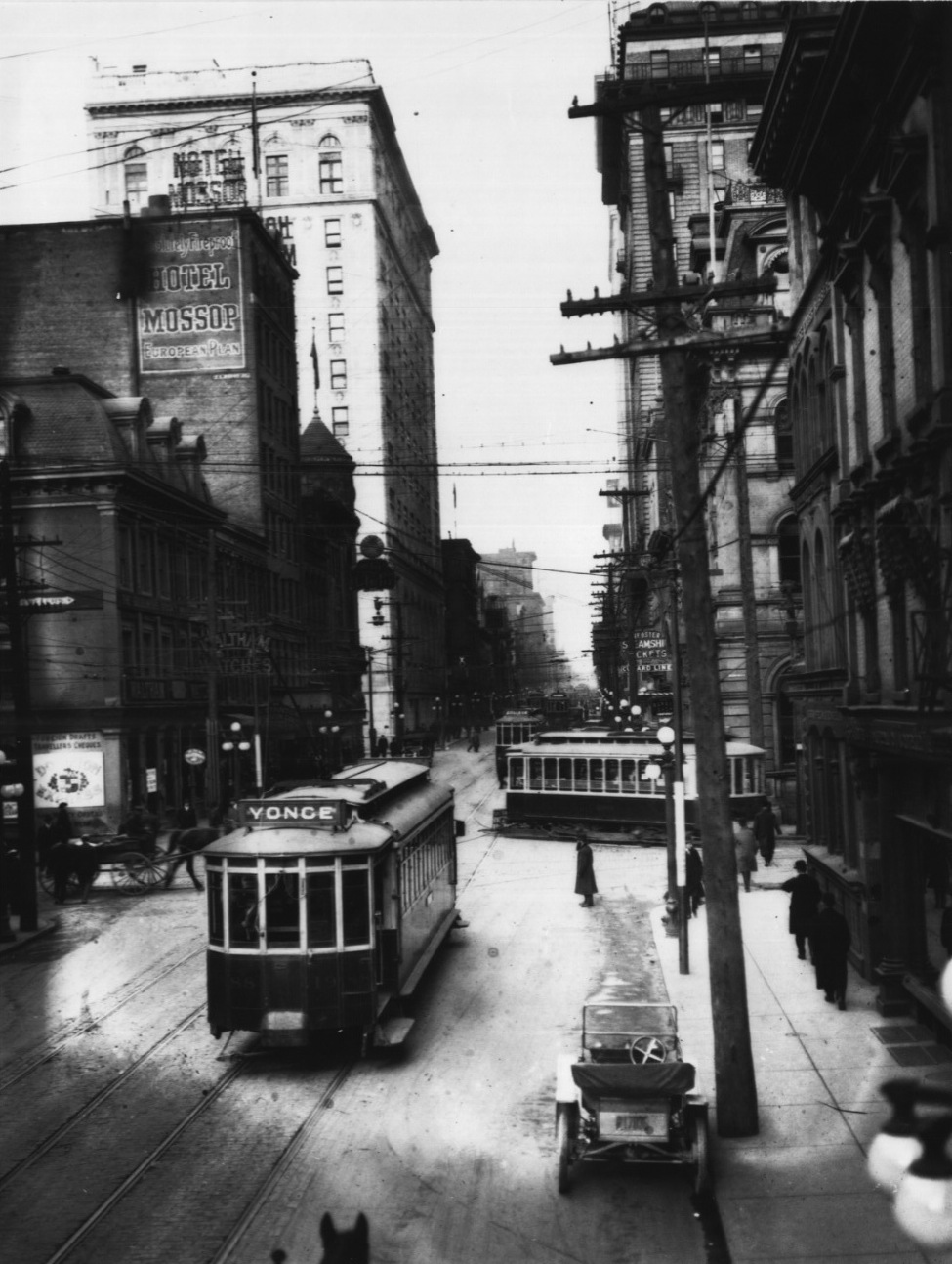
The Hotel Mossop (1919)

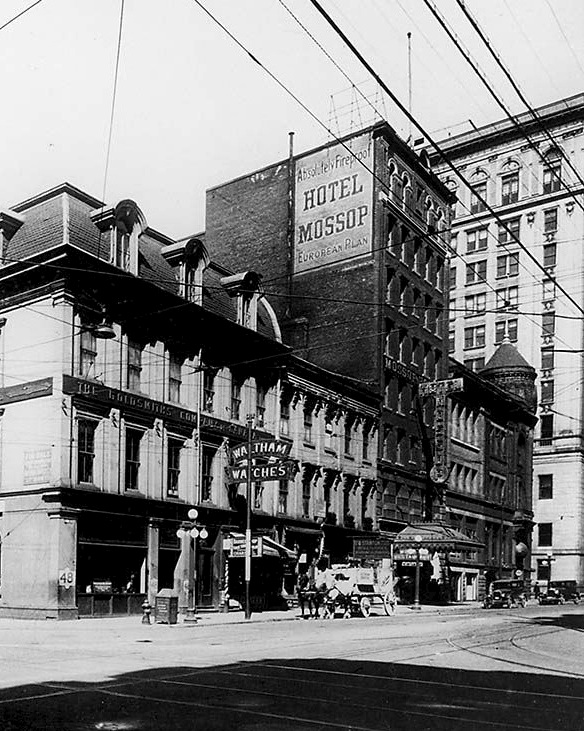
The Hotel Mossop (1927)

== Working conditions during construction ==
The Mossop was built during a large upsurge in building activity in Canada. During this period, the traditional artisanal character of many building trades was profoundly changed, and workers were often made to work in extremely unsafe conditions. This was true for many of the workers who built the Mossop. Under the anti-union Canada Foundry Corporation, which had been enlisted to help with the heavy iron construction, workers were exposed to considerable danger. This was recounted in a poem written by an ironworker who worked on the project:

We had quite a mishap on our job here today,
The gang went to roll a beam out of the way,
It came over on my foot, which started to swell,
Oh, you’ve got to be spry on Fred Mossop’s Hotel.

Each day as it passes, we have all sorts of fun,
Tommy Wells is our superintendent here and keeps us on the run,
White Coburn, the cart horse pokes fun at ‘Taff’ Bell,
Oh there’s lots of good sport here on the Mossop’s Hotel.

== Improvements and renovations ==
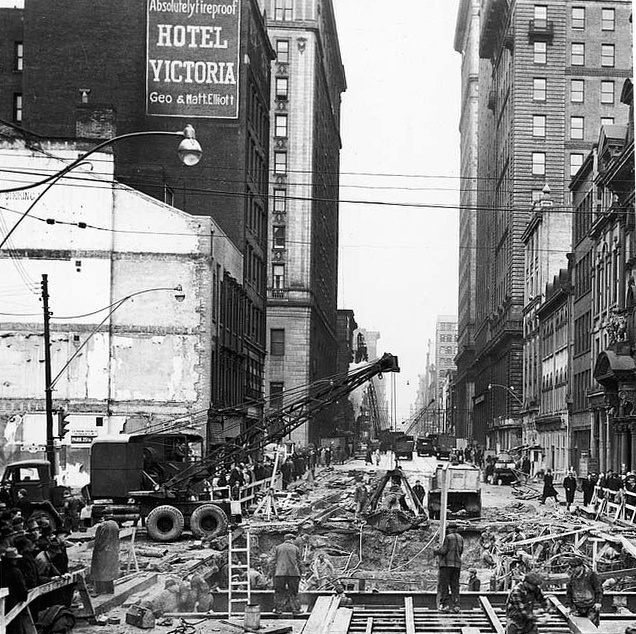
Hotel Victoria during Yonge Subway construction

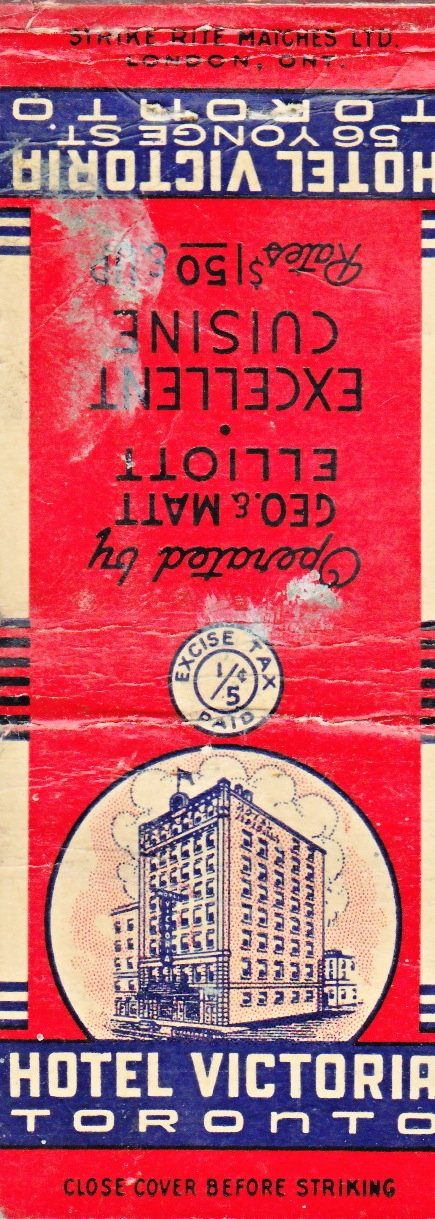
Matchbook for the hotel

=== "Hotel Victoria" renaming and initial improvements ===
After it opened, the Hotel Mossop enjoyed a number of profitable years, and procured significant investment from famed Canadian business tycoon E.P. Taylor. The hotel remained an important part of the community, and was commended by the City of Toronto in 1918 for serving as an emergency hospital during the 1918 flu pandemic, at a time when hospitals were overflowing.

Throughout the 1920s, the hotel began to face financial difficulties. This was made worse by liquor restrictions enforced during Prohibition, which precluded Taylor from owning licensed hotels alongside his brewery holdings in the province. As a result, in 1927, the hotel was forced to close, and was sold to the brothers George and Matthew Elliot. After spending a considerable amount to completely refurbish and renovate the hotel, the Elliot brothers reopened it as the "Hotel Victoria".

In subsequent years, business improved considerably, and with the outbreak of WWII, Hotel Victoria joined the patriotism that swept Toronto by establishing a "Churchill Club" to raise money for the war effort. Following the war, many of the returning soldiers called at the Victoria, and it became one of the city’s best-known landmarks.

=== Improvements in the 1970s ===
Throughout the 1950s and 60s, having had no major renovations. Although it is rumoured by the owners family, that the roof collapsed in the mid to late 60s, and the cost to repair it was approximately $10,000 at that time. The profitability of the Victoria began to erode, and it came to be known for its "cigar-chomping prospectors, ladies of the evening and beer-drinking Bay St. stockbrokers". By the late 1960s, the hotel had accumulated a significant amount of debt.

In 1971, Paul Phelan, a local real estate developer, assumed responsibility for the Victoria’s debts and purchased the hotel for $10,000. He spent over $2 million in renovations to create "a boutique hotel of the kind that had been undergoing a resurgence in New York and Europe." Phelan became personally involved in every detail of the renovation, "picking up Victorian prints in London to hang on the walls, changing the upstairs bar into a port for sailing enthusiasts, and commissioned the Ken Cameron oil painting hanging over the lobby fireplace". As a result, the hotel returned to profitability during the 1970s and early 1980s.

=== Improvements in the 1980s ===
In September 1984, when new provincial fire regulations required the hotel to upgrade new mechanical and safety systems, Phelan sold the hotel to the real estate developer Charles Goldsmith for $2.5 million.

Goldsmith spent a further $2.5 million in renovations, which took over a year to complete, and which included the replacement of the brick front of the entire first floor with architectural steel and glass panels, giving the lobby an "atrium effect". The hotel's original marble walls and pillars were restored, and the ceilings’ original plaster cornices were repaired by craftsmen who used wax molds to precisely model the shapes. The hotel reopened in March 1986 and found success as an upscale boutique hotel throughout the 1980s and 1990s.

=== 1997 to present ===
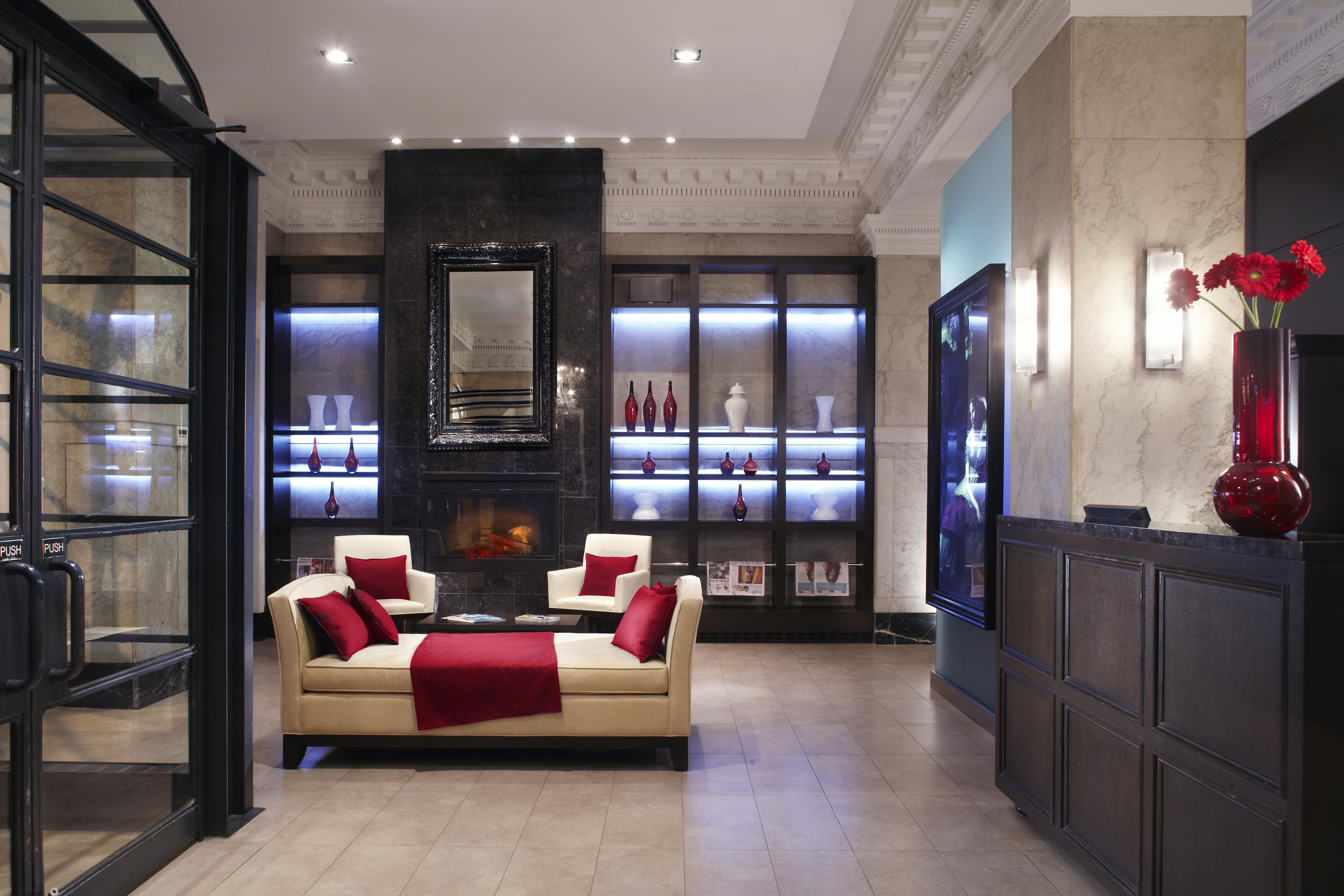
Hotel Victoria lobby (2011)

In 1997, Hotel Victoria was purchased by the Silver Hotel Group. In 2011, the lobby and guestrooms of the hotel were completely renovated. The original marble pillars and crown moulding were preserved.

In 2013, the hotel's owner submitted an application to the city to add eight stories to the hotel, which would double its height. The hotel was sold in June 2017 to QuadReal Property Group, which is developing a master plan for the block. The Silver Hotel Group will continue the property as a hotel.

Quadreal's proposal is to demolish or redevelop the entire block between Yonge and Bay, and Wellington and King. The plan would demolish everything on Yonge, saving only the hotel's facade. The hotel's entrance would be repurposed as an entrance to the entire complex. The complex's tower would be 64 storeys tall. Most of the complex would be office space, but the new complex might provide some hotel space on the 3rd to 8th floors.
